= The Tenth Dimension =

Israeli magazine

The Tenth Dimension (Ha'meimad Ha'asiri) was a magazine published in Israel as the official magazine of the Israeli Society for Science Fiction and Fantasy. The magazine was first published in 1996. Since its second issue, the magazine has had color covers, all covers painted by Avi Katz. It ceased publication in 2008, and was replaced by Once Upon a Future, an annual anthology.

The magazine published a mixture of fiction and non-fiction. From issue #9, the emphasis has been on translated short fiction. From issue #15, the magazine has had an arrangement with The Magazine of Fantasy and Science Fiction allowing it to publish stories originally published in that magazine. Issue #4 included the first publication of a Hebrew filk.

The Tenth Dimension has published some of the biggest names in science fiction and fantasy, including Neil Gaiman, Ray Bradbury, Joe Haldeman, Philip K. Dick, Orson Scott Card, Ursula K. Le Guin, Brian Aldiss and many others.

Amongst the Israeli writers published in the magazine are Vered Tochterman, Nir Yaniv, Lavie Tidhar, and Etgar Keret. Notable non-fiction work has been included in the magazine from other writers, including Emmanuel Lotem, Aharon Hauptman, and Abigail Nussbaum.

The magazine was distributed free to members of the Israeli Society for Science Fiction and Fantasy and was for sale at conventions.
