= Guy Hasson =

Israeli author (born 1971)

Guy Hasson (Hebrew: גיא חסון; born 1971) is an Israeli fantasy and science fiction author, filmmaker, and playwright. His prose fiction is almost exclusively written in English. He is a two-time winner of the Israeli Geffen Award for 'Best Story of the Year': he won it in 2003 for his story "All-of-Me(TM)" and in 2005 for his story "The Perfect Girl". Since 2006, he has focused on production of original films, including the feature-length A Stone-cold Heart. Six of his shows have been produced in the theater, either written or directed by him. In 2013, following the appearance of his short story collection "The Emoticon Generation", he organized a Blog tour of the same name.

== Books Published by Guy Hasson ==
- Tickling Butterflies, by Yaniv Publishers, translated to Hebrew. 2017. A fantasy novel.
- Secret Thoughts, by Yaniv Publishers, translated to Hebrew. 2012. A collection of science fiction novellas.
- The Emoticon Generation, published by Infinity Plus, 2012. A short story collection.
- Secret Thoughts, by Apex Publications, 2011. A collection of science fiction novellas.
- Life: The Game, published by Bitan Publishers, 2005, as "Metziut: Hamischak". A Young Adult novel.
- Hatchling, published by Bitan Publishers, 2003, as "Hatzad Ha'afel". A short story collection.
- Hope for Utopia, 2002 e-book edition no longer available. Reprinted by Fictionwise, 2005. A short novel.
- In The Beginning..., 2001 English e-book edition no longer available, serialised in Hebrew on the Bli Panika webzine 2003 as "Hatzel Shel Elohim". A short novel.

== List of Plays Written/Directed by Guy Hasson ==
- Gentility Bites, written by Guy Hasson and Adina David. Directed by Guy Hasson. Appeared in small venues across Israel.
- Snookums and Huggybuns, written and directed by Guy Hasson, appeared in the ZOA.
- The Kid Who Turned Into an Egg, written by Guy Hasson, Directed by Avraham Dana, appeared in the 1996 Haifa International Festival for Children and Youth. A children's play.
- Salomon's Stories, written by Isaac Hasson, directed by Guy Hasson, appeared in Tsavta 2.
- Every Chair's Nightmare, written and directed by Guy Hasson, appeared in Focus.
- Aleph-Noon, written by Guy Hasson, appeared in Acco Festival of Alternative Israeli Theatre.

== Films Written and Directed by Guy Hasson ==
- 'Heart of Stone'. Written and directed by Guy Hasson. 100 min. 2008. Feature-length science fiction movie in Hebrew. Premiered in Israel's ICon Festival.
- 'Seeing Red'. Written and directed by Guy Hasson. A daily horror web series. 2009. Trailer.
- 'The Indestructibles'. 2013. Written and directed by Guy Hasson. Science fiction web series. Premiered in Israel's ICon festival.
