= Gili Bar-Hillel =

English-Hebrew translator

Gili Bar-Hillel Semo
- גילי בר-הלל סמו
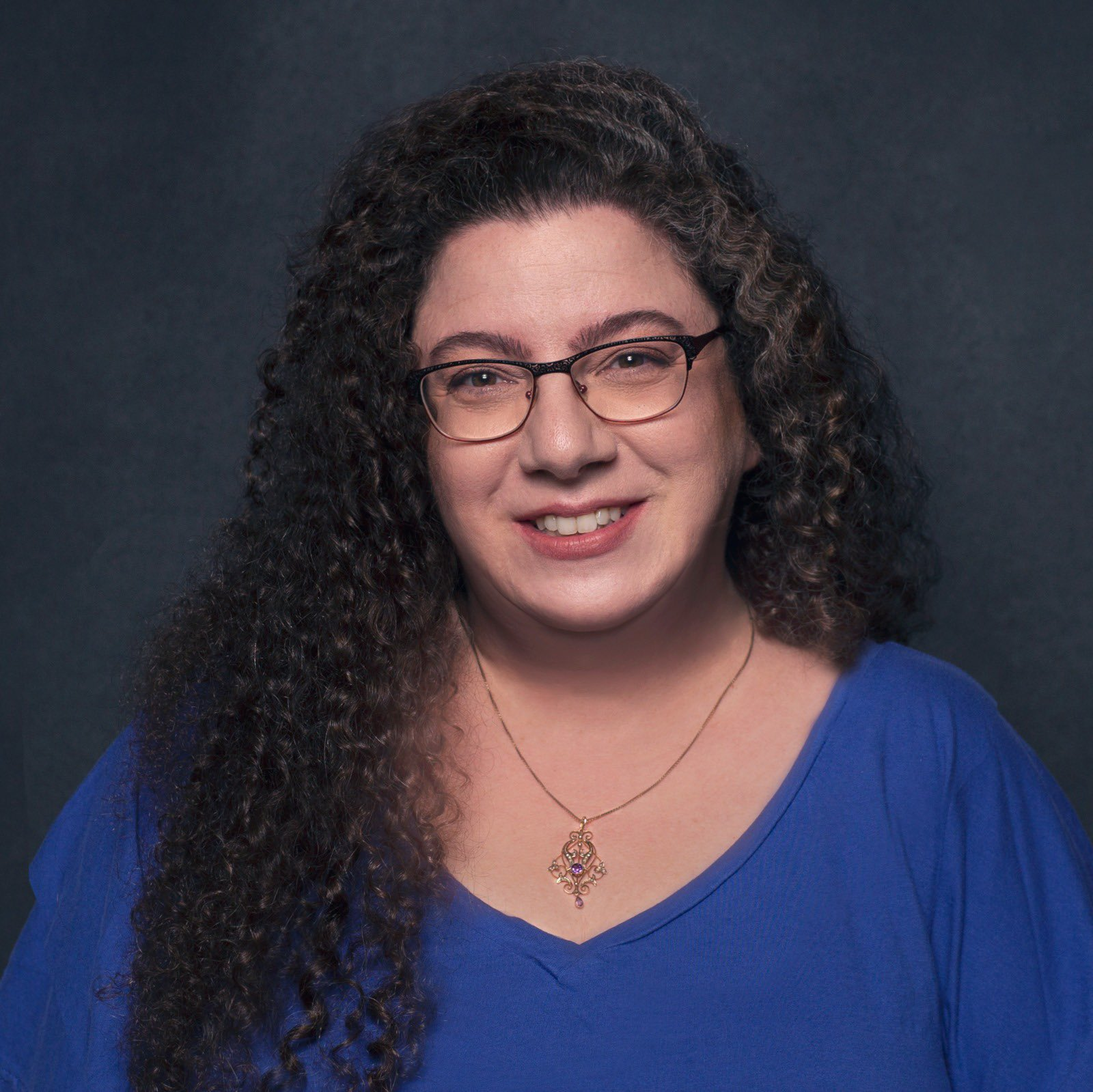
- Born: Gili Bar-Hillel; October 19, 1974 (age 52); Israel
- Occupation: Translator
- Relatives: Yehoshua Bar-Hillel (grandfather)
- Writing career
- Notable work: Harry Potter
- Notable awards: See Awards

Gili Bar-Hillel Semo (Hebrew: גילי בר-הלל סמו; born Gili Bar-Hillel on 19 October 1974) is an English-Hebrew translator from Israel, best known for translating the Harry Potter series into Hebrew.

== Biography ==
Bar-Hillel is the daughter of Maya Bar-Hillel, a professor of psychology at the Hebrew University, and the granddaughter of philosopher and linguist Yehoshua Bar-Hillel. Her mother frequently lectured in the United States and as a result she spent a lot of time there as a child, learning to read English before Hebrew.

Bar-Hillel studied at Hebrew University, Tel Aviv University, and Harvard University, and received a Bachelor of Arts in dramatic writing and dramaturgy. She lives and works in Tel Aviv, and is married with three children.

== Career ==
Before translating the Harry Potter series, Bar-Hillel was editor of children's books for the Israeli publishing house Keter, worked for the major Israeli newspaper Haaretz, directed plays, and produced radio programs. She is a member of the International Wizard of Oz Club and has been from before she translated the Harry Potter series. She has also translated books by Jacqueline Wilson, Diana Wynne Jones and Noel Streatfeild, and adapted an annotated edition of The Wizard of Oz for Hebrew readers. As well, she also reviewed picture books for the Israeli women's weekly LaIsha for several years. In 2012 Bar-Hillel founded Utz Publishing, where to this day she continues working as owner and editor in chief.

=== Harry Potter series ===
Bar-Hillel began translating the series in 1999, starting with Harry Potter and the Philosopher's Stone. Since the success of the series, Bar-Hillel has been described as a "bona fide Israeli celebrity" with a "nationwide" reputation. Because of the enormous popularity of Harry Potter, her work has come under close scrutiny by the Israeli public, especially for any deviations from the original text. The translation process was made more difficult by not knowing how the plot would develop in later books, the gender of certain characters, and the problem of how to translate various issues that are not necessarily cross-cultural, such as references to food and religion.

When the seventh book was released, Bar-Hillel flew to London ahead of the book's launch, purchased a copy and read it on the plane back to Israel.

At the Jerusalem International Book Fair in 2007, a large audience gathered to hear her talk about the translation process, with fans elbowing their way in for autographs and photos. She told reporters: "It's ridiculous, this is something that never happens to translators. The attention I've received is because I'm translating Harry Potter. It's Harry, not me".

== Translated books ==
=== Harry Potter series by J. K. Rowling ===
- Harry Potter and the Philosopher's Stone
- Harry Potter and the Chamber of Secrets
- Harry Potter and the Prisoner of Azkaban
- Harry Potter and the Goblet of Fire
- Harry Potter and the Order of the Phoenix
- Harry Potter and the Half-Blood Prince
- Harry Potter and the Deathly Hallows

- Fantastic Beasts and Where to Find Them (A part of the Harry Potter series)
- Quidditch Through the Ages (A part of the Harry Potter series)
- The Tales of Beedle the Bard (A part of the Harry Potter series)
- Harry Potter and the Cursed Child (A part of the Harry Potter series)

=== Oz books by L. Frank Baum ===
- The Wonderful Wizard of Oz (annotated edition)
- The Marvelous Land of Oz
- Ozma of Oz
- Dorothy and the Wizard in Oz
- The Road to Oz
- The Emerlad City of Oz
- The Patchwork Girl of Oz
- Tik-Tok of Oz

=== Other books (partial list) ===
- Howl's Moving Castle by Diana Wynne Jones
- Double Act by Jacqueline Wilson
- Ballet Shoes by Noel Streatfeild
- The Annotated Wizard of Oz by L. Frank Baum, annotated by Michael Patrick Hearn
- Peter and Wendy and Peter Pan in Kensington Gardens by J.M. Barrie: translated and added Hebrew annotations
- Predictably Irrational by Dan Ariely
- Misbehaving by Richard Thaler
- Cakes in Space by Philip Reeve and Sarah McIntyre
- Don't Let the Pigeon Drive the Bus! by Mo Willems
- Utterly Me, Clarice Bean by Lauren Child
- The Hundred and One Dalmatians by Dodie Smith
- Mary Poppins by P. L. Travers
- Goblin Market by Christina Rossetti
- Nimona by ND Stevenson
- The Catcher in the Rye by J. D. Salinger

== Awards ==
Bar-Hillel received a Geffen Award for her translation of Harry Potter and the Deathly Hallows:

- Best Translation of a SF&F book (2008): Gili Bar-Hillel Semo for Translating the book: Harry Potter and the Deathly Hallows by J.K. Rowling, published by Yedioth Books.

Books translated by Bar-Hillel have won several Geffen awards:

- 2008: Harry Potter and the Deathly Hallows by J. K. Rowling, translated by Gili Bar-Hillel, published by Yedioth Books.
- 2015: Ozma of Oz and Dorothy and the Wizard in Oz by L. Frank Baum
- 2017: Harry Potter and the Cursed Child play script
