= Ram Moav =

Israeli geneticist and science fiction writer

Ram Moav (Hebrew: רם מואב; 1930 - 1984) was an Israeli geneticist and science fiction writer. He is best known as a key figure in early Israeli science fiction, and as the author of the controversial novel Luna (see below), which depicts a genetic utopia on the moon. He has been cited as an early childhood read and influence by author Lavie Tidhar, amongst others.

== Novels ==
- Zirmat Chachamim (Genes for Geniuses, Inc.)
- Luna: Gan Ha'eden Hageneti (Luna: The Genetic Paradise)
