= Bar-Hillel =

Bar-Hillel is a surname. Notable people with this name include:

- Gili Bar-Hillel (born 1974), translator of Harry Potter into Hebrew, daughter of Maya
- Maya Bar-Hillel (born 1943), Israeli psychologist, mother of Gili and daughter of Yehoshua
- Yehoshua Bar-Hillel (1915–1975), Israeli philosopher, mathematician, and linguist, father of Maya
