= Keren Landsman =

Israeli epidemiologist and writer

- קרן לנדסמן
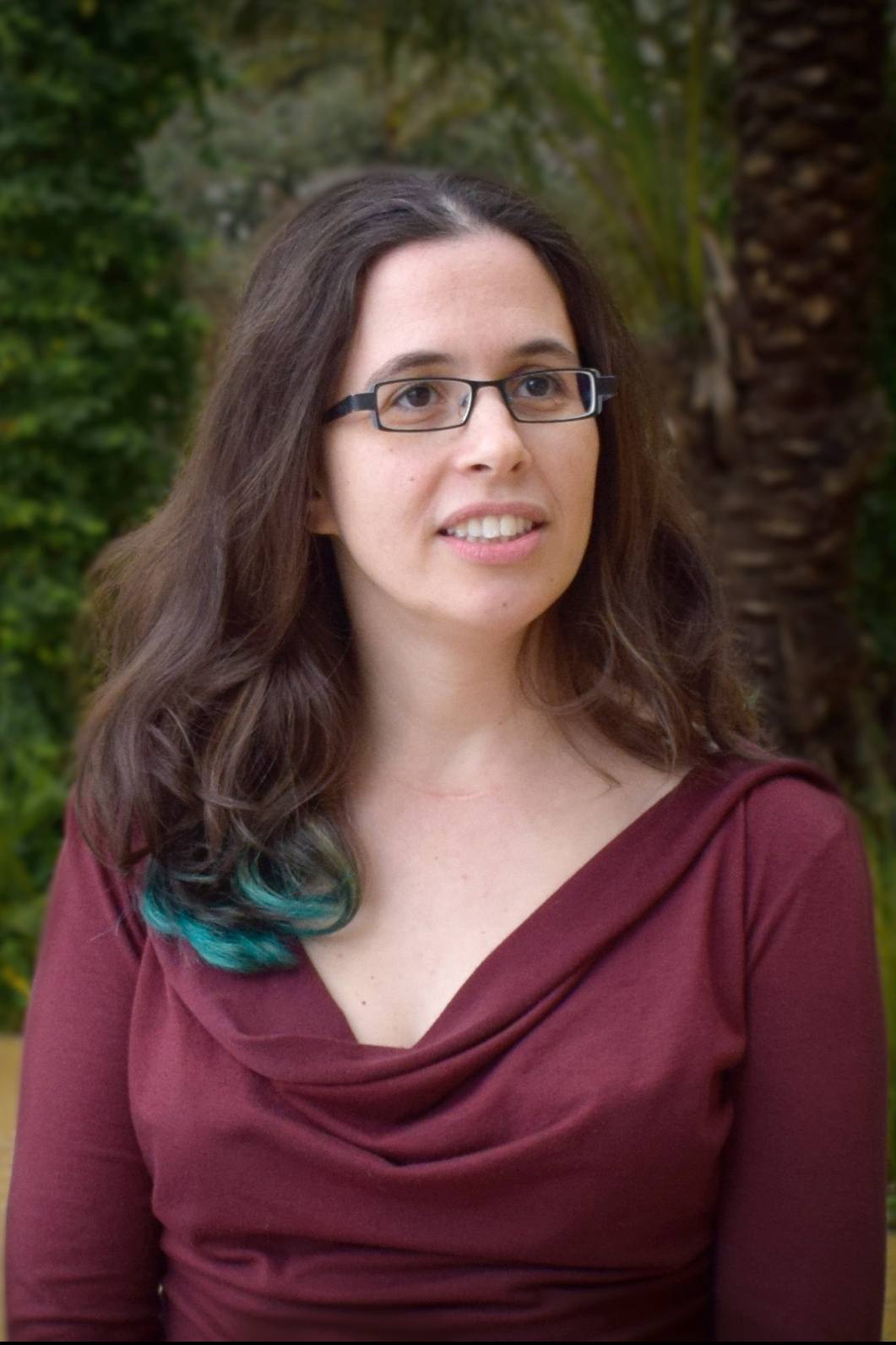
- Landsman in 2015
- Education: Technion
- Occupations: Epidemiologist, novelist
- Writing career
- Genre: Science fiction

Keren Landsman (Hebrew: קרן לנדסמן) is an Israeli epidemiologist and science fiction novelist. She has won the Geffen Award four times.

== Biography ==
Keren Landsman is a medical doctor specializing in epidemiology. She graduated from the Technion, the Israel Institute of Technology, and works at the Levinski Clinic.

Landsman heads the non-profit organization Mida'at, which works to promote public health and make medical knowledge accessible. She also writes the blog "End of the World - a View from the Gallery" (Hebrew), in which she tracks epidemics and how they spread.

Landsman began writing fantasy and science fiction when she was 12. She has published many short stories, two of which reaped Geffen Awards, Israel's premier sci-fi/fantasy literature award: "The Heisenberg Gorgon" (2011), "Alone in the Dark" (2012). At least five other stories of hers have been nominated.

Landman released her first book in 2014, a collection of short stories called Broken Skies. The book won the Geffen Award for best Israeli Science Fiction or Fantasy book.

In 2018, her second book and debut novel came out, Heart of the Circle. The book was a best-seller in Israel. The English-language edition came out in 2019. This book won a Geffen Award as well.

Landsman is married to Yoav Landsman, a senior engineer in the SpaceIL organization. They have two children.

== Bibliography ==
- Broken Skies (2014)
- The Heart of the Circle (2019)
