= Richard N. Rosett =

American academic (1928–2009)

Dean of the University of Chicago Booth School of Business
- In office 1974–1982
- Preceded by: Sidney Davidson
- Succeeded by: John P. Gould

Personal details
- Born: February 29, 1928
- Died: April 4, 2009 (aged 81)
- Education: Columbia University (BA); Yale University (PhD)
- Profession: Economist; Academic administrator

Richard Nathaniel Rosett (February 29, 1928 – April 4, 2009) was an American economist and university administrator who served as the dean of the University of Chicago Booth School of Business from 1974 to 1982, Arts and Sciences at Washington University in St. Louis from 1984 to 1987, as well as chairman of the National Bureau of Economic Research.

== Biography ==
Rosett was born on February 29, 1928. He received his B.A. from Columbia University in 1953, and a PhD from Yale University in 1957.

He joined the University of Rochester's economics department in its founding year, eventually becoming departmental chair from 1966 to 1974, during which he mentored future Nobel Prize winner Richard Thaler. Rosett had begun buying and collecting wine since the 1950s, and Thaler studied his wine buying habits and incorporated them into his award-winning research in Behavioral economics.

From 1974 to 1982, he served as the dean of the University of Chicago Booth School of Business. During his tenure, the school saw enrollment rise 50 percent, faculty increased by one-third, and enrollment doubled. The quality of enrolling students also increased greatly. He was appointed Dean of Arts and Sciences at Washington University in St. Louis in 1984 and served in that position until 1987, when he stepped down and remained a professor of economics at the university until 1990.

From 1977, he has been a member of the executive committee of the National Bureau of Economic Research, eventually becoming chairman of NBER.

In 1990, he became Dean of the College of Business at Rochester Institute of Technology (now named Saunders College of Business) and served until 1996. During his tenure, the school was named one of the top 50 undergraduate business programs by the U.S. News & World Report. As dean of the business college, he also helped found the U.S. Business School in Prague, an MBA program aimed at transforming the Czech economy from socialist to free market.

In 2006, Rosett received an honorary degree from Keuka College, where he was also a member of the college's board of trustees.

Rosett died on April 4, 2009.
