= National Bureau of Economic Research =

American private nonprofit research organization

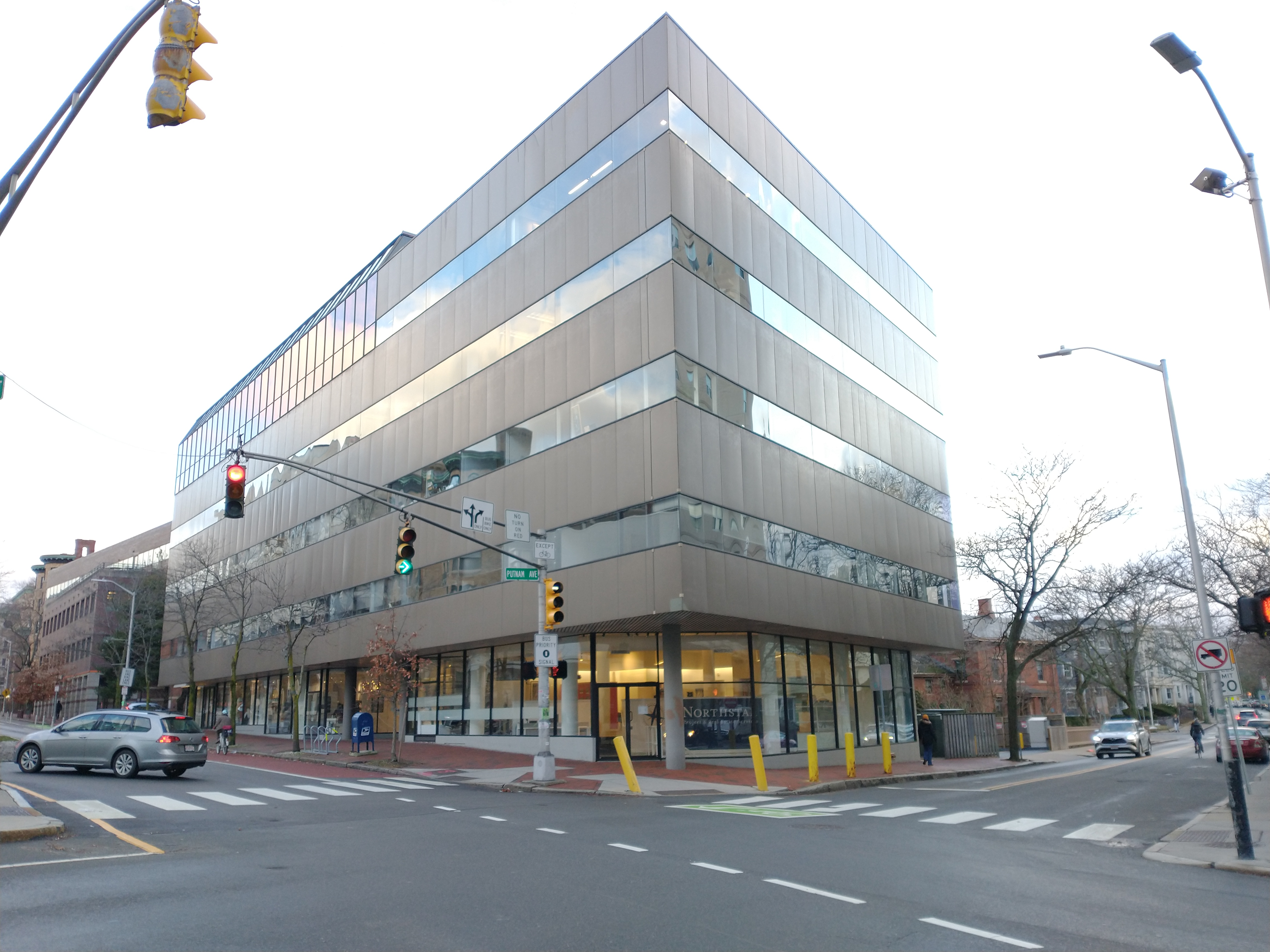
- The building in Cambridge, Massachusetts, that contains the NBER main offices
- Abbreviation: NBER
- Founded: 1920; 106 years ago
- Founder: Wesley Clair Mitchell
- Type: Nonprofit organization
- Tax ID no.: 13-1641075
- Location(s): Cambridge, Massachusetts, United States; 42.3697°N 71.1127°W
- Leader: James M. Poterba
- Revenue: $41.7 million (2023)
- Expenses: $38.5 million (2023)
- Website: nber.org

The National Bureau of Economic Research (NBER) is an American private nonprofit think tank "committed to undertaking and disseminating unbiased economic research among public policymakers, business professionals, and the academic community". The NBER is known for proposing start and end dates for recessions in the United States.

Many chairpersons of the Council of Economic Advisers were previously NBER research associates, including the former NBER president and Harvard professor Martin Feldstein. The NBER's current president and CEO is James M. Poterba of MIT.

== History ==
=== Founding ===
The NBER was established in 1920 following debates during the Progressive era over income distribution. Founded by Malcolm Rorty and Nachum Stone, the NBER aimed to fill the information gap on economic data. The organization's research is restricted to presenting data and findings without making policy recommendations.

=== Early years ===
The NBER initially received support from the Carnegie Foundation, the Laura Spelman Rockefeller Foundation, and various corporations. Columbia University professor Wesley Clair Mitchell was the first director of research, guiding the organization's research for 25 years. The NBER's initial projects included measuring labor's share of national income and studying unemployment and business-cycle fluctuations.

=== Simon Kuznets ===
In 1927, Mitchell brought in Simon Kuznets, who later played a pivotal role in developing the U.S. national income accounts. Kuznets' work laid the foundation for the Nobel Prize he received in 1971.

=== Post-War expansion ===
After World War II, the NBER expanded its research scope. Arthur Burns succeeded Mitchell as research director. The 1950s and 1960s saw groundbreaking work by Milton Friedman and Anna Schwartz on monetary policy's impact on business cycles. Research in labor economics also flourished during this period.

NBER has been credited with mainstreaming the study of human capital in economics. Prior to the 1950s, the concept of human capital was rarely used in economics, but throughout the 1960s, NBER increased usage of the concept.

=== Presidential leadership ===
Arthur Burns became NBER's president in 1956, followed by John R. Meyer in 1967. Meyer introduced several initiatives, including two NBER journals and the establishment of NBER offices in various cities.

=== Martin Feldstein era ===
In 1977, Martin S. Feldstein became the NBER's president, transforming the organization. He expanded the NBER's network of university-based affiliates, moved its headquarters to Cambridge, Massachusetts and introduced the NBER Working Paper Series. Feldstein also established research programs focusing on specific areas and initiated the NBER Summer Institute.

=== Recent years ===
James Poterba succeeded Feldstein in 2008, continuing the NBER's expansion. The number of affiliated researchers grew significantly, and new programs and working groups were introduced. The NBER now distributes over 1,200 new research studies annually and holds around 125 meetings each year on various economic topics.

In September 2010, after a conference call with its Business Cycle Dating Committee, the NBER declared that the Great Recession in the United States had officially ended in 2009 and lasted from December 2007 to June 2009. In response, a number of newspapers wrote that the majority of Americans did not believe the recession was over, mainly because they were still struggling and because the country still faced high unemployment.

== Research ==
The NBER's research activities encompass 20 research programs on different subjects and 14 working groups.

=== Research programs ===
- Asset Pricing
- Children
- Corporate Finance
- Development Economics
- Development of the American Economy
- Economic Fluctuations and Growth
- Economics of Aging
- Economics of Education
- Environment and Energy Economics
- Health Care
- Health Economics
- Industrial Organization
- International Finance and Macroeconomics
- International Trade and Investment
- Labor Studies
- Law and Economics
- Monetary Economics
- Political Economy
- Productivity, Innovation, and Entrepreneurship
- Public Economics

=== Working groups ===
- Behavioral Finance
- Chinese Economy
- Cohort Studies
- Economics of Crime
- Entrepreneurship
- Risks of Financial Institutions
- Household Finance
- Innovation Policy
- Insurance
- Market Design
- Organizational Economics
- Personnel Economics
- Race and Stratification in the Economy
- Urban Economics

== Conferences ==
The NBER convenes over 120 meetings each year at which researchers share and discuss their latest findings and launch new projects. The Summer Institute, a collection of nearly 50 smaller meetings, is held annually in July.

== Notable members ==
=== Winners of the Nobel Memorial Prize in Economic Sciences ===
- Peter Howitt, 2025
- Daron Acemoglu, 2024
- Simon Johnson, 2024
- James A. Robinson, 2024
- Claudia Goldin, 2023
- Ben Bernanke, 2022
- Joshua Angrist, 2021
- David Card, 2021
- Guido Imbens, 2021
- Abhijit Banerjee, 2019
- Esther Duflo, 2019
- Michael Kremer, 2019
- William Nordhaus, 2018
- Paul Romer, 2018
- Richard Thaler, 2017
- Oliver Hart, 2016
- Bengt Holmström, 2016
- Angus Deaton, 2015
- Lars Peter Hansen, 2013
- Robert J. Shiller, 2013
- Alvin E. Roth, 2012
- Thomas J. Sargent, 2011
- Christopher A. Sims, 2011
- Peter Diamond, 2010
- Dale T. Mortensen, 2010
- Paul Krugman, 2008
- Finn E. Kydland, 2004
- Edward C. Prescott, 2004
- Robert F. Engle, 2003
- George Akerlof, 2001
- Joseph Stiglitz, 2001
- James Heckman, 2000
- Daniel McFadden, 2000
- Robert C. Merton, 1997
- Myron Scholes, 1997
- Robert Lucas Jr., 1995
- Robert Fogel, 1993
- Gary Becker, 1992
- George Stigler, 1982
- Theodore Schultz, 1979
- Milton Friedman, 1976
- Wassily Leontief, 1973
- Simon Kuznets, 1971

=== Council of Economic Advisers (CEA) Chairs ===
- Cecilia Rouse, 2021–2023
- Alan Krueger, 2011–2013
- Austan Goolsbee, 2010–2011
- Christina Romer, 2009–2010
- Edward Lazear, 2006–2009
- Ben Bernanke, 2005–2006
- Harvey S. Rosen, 2005
- Greg Mankiw, 2003–2005
- Glenn Hubbard, 2001–2003
- Janet Yellen, 1997–1999
- Joseph Stiglitz, 1995–1997
- Michael Boskin, 1989–1993
- Martin Feldstein, 1982–1984
- Arthur F. Burns, 1953–1956

=== Other notable members ===
- Alberto Alesina
- Susan Athey
- Robert Barro
- Olivier Blanchard
- John H. Cochrane
- Aaron Edlin
- John Lipsky
- Francis Longstaff
- Alan Marcus
- Richard N. Rosett
- Anna Schwartz
- Eduardo Schwartz
- Andrei Shleifer
- Richard Zeckhauser

== Funding ==
The NBER is funded by grants from government agencies, private foundations, corporate and individual contributions, and income from the NBER's investment portfolio. The largest funders are the National Institutes of Health, the National Science Foundation, the Social Security Administration, and the Alfred P. Sloan Foundation.

== Policy impact ==
In a 2010 report by the University of Pennsylvania, the NBER was ranked as the second most influential domestic economic policy think tank, after the Brookings Institution.

== Recession markers ==
The NBER is known for its start and end dates of U.S. recessions. The NBER is seen by some as an arbiter of whether the U.S. is in a recession. The National Bureau of Economic Research (NBER) does not function as a real-time arbiter in determining the onset and duration of recessions but rather as a retrospective marker. The origins of this role can be traced to the 1960s when the Commerce Department began publishing a digest that relied on NBER's analysis of the business cycle. The recession markers are made by the Business Cycle Dating Committee, whose eight members are selected by the president of the NBER. The eight members tend to be highly distinguished economists. The NBER's Business Cycle Dating Committee, responsible for officially dating recessions, does not make real-time judgments or predict economic downturns. The committee's meetings are neither publicized nor on a fixed schedule. The board's decisions are not always unanimous, but the disagreements within the committee tend not to be about the presence of a recession; rather they are about the specific start and end points of the recession.

The NBER uses a broader definition of a recession than commonly appears in the media. The media commonly define a recession as two consecutive quarters of a shrinking gross domestic product (GDP). In contrast, the NBER defines a recession as "a significant decline in economic activity spread across the economy, lasting more than a few months, normally visible in real GDP, real income, employment, industrial production, and wholesale-retail sales". Business cycle dates are determined by the NBER dating committee. Typically, these dates correspond to peaks and troughs in real GDP, although not always so.

The NBER prefers this method for a variety of reasons. First, it believes that by measuring a wide range of economic factors, rather than just GDP, a more accurate assessment of the health of an economy can be gained. For instance, the NBER considers not only the product-side estimates like GDP, but also income-side estimates such as the gross domestic income (GDI). Second, since the NBER attempts to measure the duration of economic expansion and recession at a fine grain, it emphasized monthly, rather than quarterly, economic indicators. Finally, by using a looser definition, the NBER can take into account the depth of decline in economic activity. For example, the NBER may declare not a recession simply because of two quarters of very slight negative growth, but rather an economic stagnation. However, the NBER does not precisely define what is meant by "a significant decline", but rather determines if one has existed on a case-by-case basis after examining catalogued factors that have no defined grade scale or weighting factors. The subjectivity of the determination has led to criticism and accusations committee members can "play politics" in their determinations. Another factor in favor of this alternate definition is that a long-term economic contraction may not always have two consecutive quarters of negative growth, as was the case in the recession following the bursting of the dot-com bubble.

== See also ==
- Economic Cycle Research Institute
