= Haim Eshed =

Israeli professor of aeronautics and astronautics (born 1933)

- חיים אשד
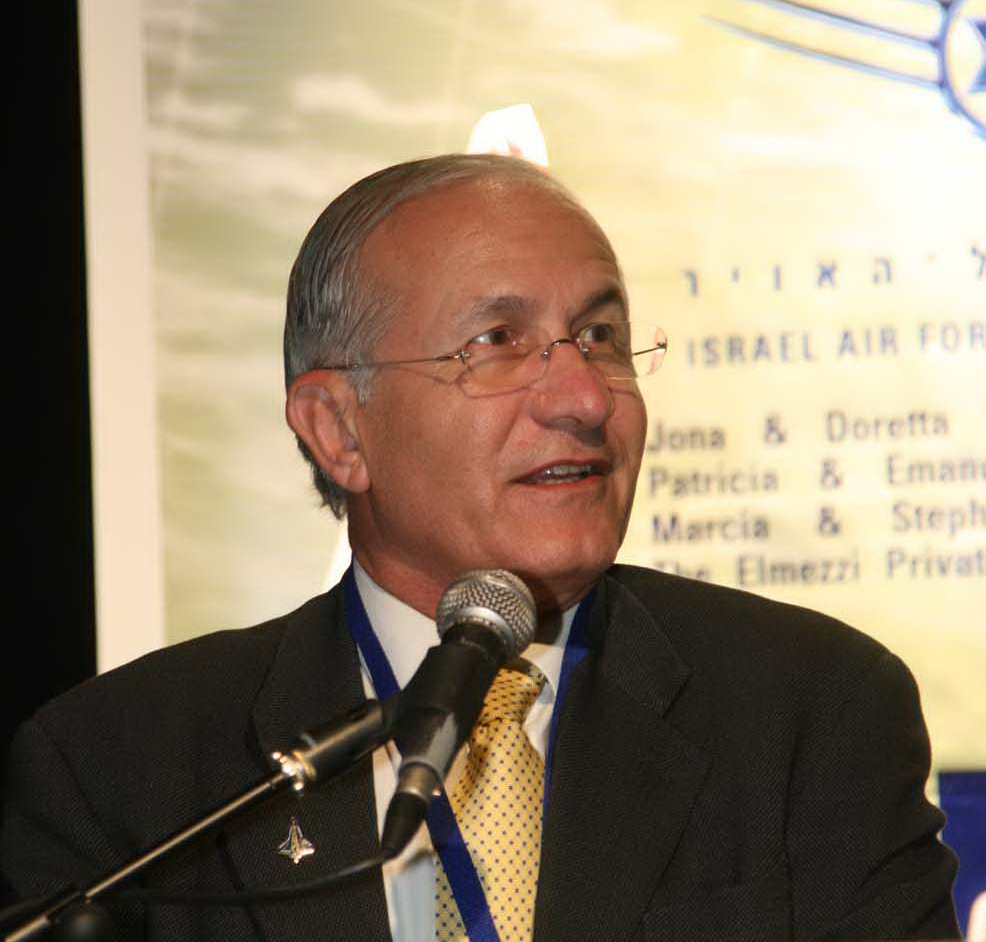
- Haim Eshed in January 2008 at the Fisher Institute for Air and Space Strategic Studies
- Born: 1933 (age 92–93)
- Education: Technion – Israel Institute of Technology
- Occupations: Professor of aeronautical engineering; Military officer; Civil servant
- Organizations: Israel Ministry of Defense; Israel Defence Forces; Technion – Israel Institute of Technology
- Awards: Israel Defense Prize (3); Chief of Staff Citation
- Military career
- Allegiance: Israel
- Branch: Military Intelligence Directorate
- Rank: Brigadier General

Haim Eshed alternatively romanized as Chaim Eshed (Hebrew: חיים אשד; born 1933) is an Israeli visiting professor of aeronautics and astronautics at various space technology research institutions. A retired brigadier general in Israeli Military Intelligence, Eshed was director of space programs for Israel Ministry of Defense for nearly 30 years, is former chair of the Space Committee of the National Council for Research and Development for the Ministry of Science, Technology and Space and a member of the steering committee of Israel Space Agency. Eshed is responsible for the launch of 20 Israeli made satellites, and he is widely cited as the father of Israel's space program.

In 1967, Eshed was awarded the Chief of Staff Citation, the highest non-combat decoration awarded by the IDF. Throughout his career he also received the Israel Defense Prize - the highest civilian defense honor of the State of Israel - three times, but the reasons remain classified.

Eshed served at the highly secretive Unit 81, which provided technological solutions to the IDF's Military Intelligence Directorate.

In 2020, Eshed became notable for promoting a UFO conspiracy theory claiming that world governments were secretly working with aliens.

== Career ==
Eshed holds a bachelor's degree in electronics engineering from Technion - Israel Institute of Technology, as well as a master's and doctorate in aeronautical engineering.

In 1979, as a colonel in Israel's Military Intelligence Directorate, Eshed proposed the establishment of an independent satellite capability in order to collect intelligence from the Sinai after the withdrawal of Israeli forces.

He was space director during the 2007 launch of the spy satellite Ofek-7, which he said would help with "the Iranian issue".

When he retired in 2011, he was described in Israeli media as the father of Israel's space capabilities programme.

== Extra-terrestrial claims ==
In December 2020, Eshed claimed in an interview with Israeli national newspaper Yediot Aharonot that the United States government had been in contact with extraterrestrial life for years and had signed secret agreements with a "Galactic Federation" in order to perform experiments on Earth, and that there is a joint base underground on Mars where they collaborate with American astronauts. He also stated that US president Donald Trump was aware of this and was "on the verge" of informing everyone of their existence, but was stopped by the "Galactic Federation", who wished to prevent mass hysteria.

The interview, in Hebrew, gained traction after parts were published in English by The Jerusalem Post. UFO investigator Nick Pope told NBC News that the ufology community wanted to know whether Eshed's account is primary or secondary information:

"Either this is some sort of practical joke or publicity stunt to help sell his book, perhaps with something having been lost in translation, or someone in the know is breaking ranks."

The book is The Universe Beyond the Horizon: Conversations with Professor Haim Eshed written by author Hagar Yanai, published in November 2020. In the book, Eshed makes claims that include stories of how aliens prevented potential nuclear disasters, including an unspecified nuclear incident during the Bay of Pigs Invasion.

In 2020, Isaac Ben-Israel, then current chairman of the Israel Space Agency, remarked to The Times of Israel that although Eshed is the father of Israel's space capabilities, he went "too far" with his claims, and it is unlikely that human-alien encounters are occurring. He added that for decades Eshed fancied unconventional interpretations of incoherent space signals that most consider to be of natural origin. In response to queries by NBC News, a NASA spokesperson reaffirmed that "we have yet to find signs of extraterrestrial life".
