= Hagar Yanai =

Israeli novelist

Hagar Yanai הגר ינאי
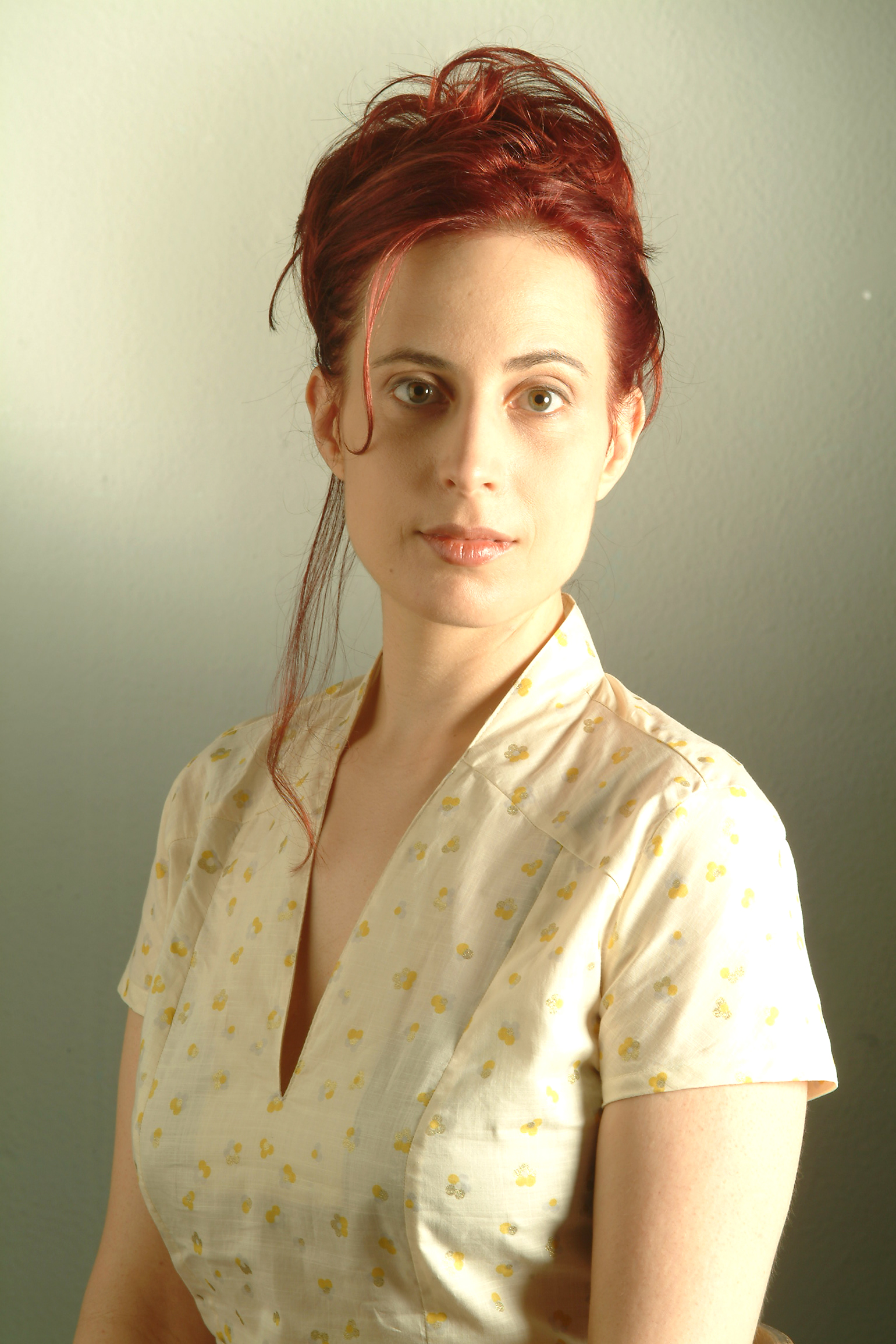
- Hagar Yanai
- Born: 1972 (age 53–54); Barkai, Israel
- Occupation: Novelist
- Known for: Prime Minister's Award Winner, Geffen Award, Devorah Omer Award

Hagar Yanai (Hebrew: הגר ינאי; born 1972) is an Israeli author. She is the recipient of the 2008 Prime Minister's Award for Israeli Authors, and of the Devora Omer Award for Work of Literature for Middle Grade and Young Adults. She is also a three-time recipient of the Geffen Award for Best Original Hebrew Fantasy.

== Biography ==
Hagar Yanai was born in Kibbutz Barkai. Following her army service, she studied Anthroposophy for two years at Kibbutz Harduf and then traveled to Japan where she studied for a year with a Zen master in Tokyo, and worked as a hostess in night clubs. She spent some time in a Zen monastery in Kyosho. Her first book, A Woman in Light, was inspired by her affair with the head of the monastery. Yanai received her bachelor's degree in creative writing and screenwriting from Camera Obscura School of Art, and her master's degree in literature from Ben-Gurion University of the Negev.

== Literary career ==
Yanai worked as a journalist for Hayim Aherim (A Different Life) magazine, and the weekend supplement of Hebrew daily Haaretz. She was also a book critic for the Hebrew daily Globes, and the literary and film critic for Israeli Television Channel Two. Today, she works as a literary editor, teaches creative writing, and is a book critic for the IDF radio station and Israel Television Channel One.

Yanai's second book, Alex's Eternity Machine, describes the journey of a rebellious female soldier in the Golan Heights. The soldier, Duba, runs away from a young and aggressive officer who wants to rehabilitate her, and looks for Alex, a young physics genius, with whom she fell in love in her youth, and who is trying to invent the Perpetuum Mobile. The book was nominated for the 2006 Sapir Prize for Literature.

Yanai's third book, The Leviathan of Babylon, is the first of a fantasy trilogy. She wrote the book in a groundbreaking effort to create a widespread audience in the Israeli literary scene for the fantasy genre - her favorite. The book follows the adventures of Jonathan Margolis and his sister Ella, who enter a parallel world, the Empire of Babylon, ruled by the Guild of Hashdarpans – brutal physician-priests who fear the rise of the Leviathan, son of the Abyss. The book draws inspiration from Jewish, Babylonian and Middle-Eastern mythology. The Leviathan of Babylon was awarded the 2007 Geffen Award for Best Original Hebrew Fantasy.

Yanai's fourth book and the second in The Leviathan of Babylon trilogy, The Water Between the Worlds, was published in February 2008. It describes the beginning of the great battle for the Empire of Babylon. The four protagonists from the first book, Jonathan and Ella Margolis, Hillel Ben-Shahar, and Princess Nin-Urmuz, are faced with even more difficult challenges and ordeals. The Water Between the Worlds was awarded the 2008 Geffen Award for Best Original Hebrew Fantasy.

The third book in The Leviathan of Babylon trilogy, Into The Abyss, was published in 2017 by Modan and Ocean Publishing. The Water Between the Worlds was awarded the 2018 Geffen Award for Best Original Hebrew Fantasy and the 2019 Devora Omer Award for Work of Literature Targeting Middle Grade and Young Adult.

Yanai was also awarded the 2008 Prime Minister's Award for Hebrew Literary Works.

== Published works ==
- A Woman in Light, Jerusalem, Keter, 2001
- Alex's Eternity Machine, Jerusalem, Keter, 2004
- The Leviathan of Babylon, (Fantasy, Leviathan Trilogy I), Jerusalem, Keter, 2006
- The Water Between the Worlds, (Fantasy, Leviathan Trilogy II), Jerusalem, Keter, 2008
- A Safe Place For The Heart, Kinneret Zmora-Bitan Dvir, 2011
- Into The Abyss, (Fantasy, Leviathan Trilogy III), Modan and Ocean Publishing, 2017
- Mila And The Dream Snatchers (Middle Grade), Tel Aviv, Am Oved, 2019
- The universe beyond the horizon - conversations with Professor Haim Eshed, Jerusalem, Yedioth Books, 11/2020

== Edited books ==
- Roses Over There: Erotic Fiction by Israeli Writers, Tel Aviv, Alfa, 2003
- Signed By / Orit Shahar-Guber, Jerusalem, Keter, 2005

== See also ==
- Hebrew literature
