= Geffen Award =

Israeli science fiction and fantasy award

- Awarded for: various categories, all relating to science fiction and fantasy
- Country: Israel
- Presented by: Israeli Society for Science Fiction and Fantasy
- First award: 1999; 27 years ago
- Website: http://geffen.sf-f.org.il/

The Geffen Award (Hebrew: פרס גפן) is an annual literary award given by the Israeli Society for Science Fiction and Fantasy since 1999, and presented at the ICon festival, the annual Science Fiction and Fantasy Convention, It is named in honour of editor and translator Amos Geffen, who was one of the society's founders.

== Categories ==
The Geffen awards are given out in six categories:

- Best Original Science Fiction or Fantasy Novel (since 2003)
- Best Original Science Fiction or Fantasy Short Story (since 2002)
- Best Translated Science Fiction Novel.
- Best Translated Fantasy Novel.
- Best Translated Book for Children or Young Adults (since 2008).
- Best Translation of a Science Fiction or Fantasy Novel (since 2008, given in collaboration with the Israeli Translator's Association).

== List of winners by year ==
=== 2026 ===
- Best Original Science Fiction or Fantasy Novel: The Demons' Embassy: An Adventure in Azazel by Judith Kagan.
- Best Original Science Fiction or Fantasy Short Story: Because the Night by Rotem Baruchin, Published in "Once Upon a Future 2025" and Gold and Mist by Odeliya Goldman, Published in “Bli Panika”.
- Best Translated Science Fiction Novel: Just One Damned Thing After Another by Jodi Taylor, Translated by Michal Kreitlar, Alma Books Ltd.
- Best Translated Fantasy Novel: A Wizard’s Guide to Defensive Baking by T. Kingfisher, Translated by Gili Bar-Hillel Semo, Matar Publishing House.
- Best Translated Book for Children or Young Adults: Impossible Creatures by Katherine Rundell, Translated by Debbie Eylon, Utz Publishin.

=== 2025 ===
- Best Original Science Fiction or Fantasy Novel: Beginner's Luck, Reut Weis.
- Best Original Science Fiction or Fantasy Short Story: Miranda Station Doesn't Answer, Keren Landsman.
- Best Translated Science Fiction Novel: The Obelisk Gate, N. K. Jemisin.
- Best Translated Fantasy Novel: The Others: Written in Red, Murder of Crows, Anne Bishop.
- Best Translated Book for Children or Young Adults: Earthsea: A Wizard of Earthsea, The Tombs of Atuan, The Farthest Shore, Ursula K. Le Guin.

=== 2024 ===
- Best Original Science Fiction or Fantasy Novel: The Archangel Sisters - Gate of Shadows, Naama Bar Shira.
- Best Original Science Fiction or Fantasy Short Story: Where the books are, Bar Fischbein.
- Best Translated Science Fiction Novel: The Fifth Season, N. K. Jemisin.
- Best Translated Fantasy Novel: The Hidden Legacy: Sapphire flames, Emerald Blaze, Ruby Fever, Ilona Andrews.
- Best Translated Book for Children or Young Adults: The Chalice of the Gods, Rick Riordan.

=== 2023 ===
- Best Original Science Fiction or Fantasy Novel: The City Guardians, Rotem Baruchin.
- Best Original Science Fiction or Fantasy Short Story: Blue Bubblegum Slushy, Rotem Baruchin.
- Best Translated Science Fiction Novel: Project Hail Mary, Andy Weir.
- Best Translated Fantasy Novel: The Lazy Girl's Guide to Magic, Helen Harper.
- Best Translated Book for Children or Young Adults: The Left-Handed Booksellers of London, Garth Nix.

=== 2022 ===
- Best Original Science Fiction or Fantasy Novel: What Others Think in Me, Yoav Blum.
- Best Original Science Fiction or Fantasy Short Story: Dust, Keren Landsman.
- Best Translated Science Fiction Novel: Not awarded.
- Best Translated Fantasy Novel: The Once and Future Witches, Alix E. Harrow.
- Best Translated Book for Children or Young Adults: Tik-Tok of Oz, L. Frank Baum.

=== 2021 ===
- Best Original Science Fiction or Fantasy Novel: The World Beneath the Rug, Lee Evron.
- Best Original Science Fiction or Fantasy Short Story: To Open (or: The Light in The Keyway), Hila Benyovits-Hoffman.
- Best Translated Science Fiction Novel: The Ballad of Songbirds and Snakes, Suzanne Collins
- Best Translated Fantasy Novel: The Ten Thousand Doors of January, Alix E. Harrow.
- Best Translated Book for Children or Young Adults: Children of Blood and Bone, Tomi Adeyemi.

=== 2020 ===
- Best Original Science Fiction or Fantasy Novel: Satisfying the dragon, Masha Tzur Gluzman.
- Best Original Science Fiction or Fantasy Short Story: Blue iceberg beer, Rotem Baruchin.
- Best Translated Science Fiction Novel: Not awarded.
- Best Translated Fantasy Novel: Spinning Silver, Naomi Novik.
- Best Translated Book for Children or Young Adults: Cuckoo Song, Frances Hardinge.

=== 2019 ===
- Best Original Science Fiction or Fantasy Novel: Heart of the Circle, Keren Landsman.
- Best Original Science Fiction or Fantasy Short Story: Dragon Bound, Rotem Baruchin.
- Best Translated Science Fiction Novel: Artemis, Andy Weir
- Best Translated Fantasy Novel: The Alloy of Law.
- Best Translated Book for Children or Young Adults: The Ship of the Dead.

=== 2017 ===
- Best Original Science Fiction or Fantasy Novel: The Unswitchable, Yoav Blum.
- Best Original Science Fiction or Fantasy Short Story: Lost and Found, Rotem Baruchin.
- Best Translated Science Fiction Novel: Earth Afire and Earth Awakens Translated by Boaz weiss.
- Best Translated Fantasy Novel: Harry Potter and the Cursed Child Translated by Gili Bar-Hillel.
- Best Translated Book for Children or Young Adults: The Hidden Oracle Translated by Yael Achmon.

=== 2016 ===
- Best Translated Science Fiction Novel: Redshirts , John Scalzi Translated by Zafrir Grosman, Opus Press
- Best Translated Fantasy Novel: Fool's Assassin, Robin Hobb Translated by Zafrir Grosman, Opus Press
- Best Translated YA Book: The Blood of Olympus, Rick Riordan Translated by Yael Achmon, Graff publishing
- Best Original Science Fiction or Fantasy Short Story: Requiem to Mathew, Avial Tochterman
- Best Original Science Fiction or Fantasy Novel: Lake of Shadows, Roni Gelbfish, Gold Fish

=== 2015 ===
- Best Translated Science Fiction Novel: The Martian, Andy Weir Translated by Didi Chanoch, The Armchair Publishing House
- Best Translated Fantasy Novel: The Ocean at the End of the Lane, Neil Gaiman Translated by Didi Chanoch, The Armchair Publishing House
- Best Translated YA Book: Ozma of Oz and Dorothy and the Wizard in Oz, L. Frank Baum Translated by Gili Bar-Hillel Semo, Utz Books
- Best Original Science Fiction or Fantasy Short Story: Five Four Three Two One, Hila Benyovits-Hoffman
- Best Original Science Fiction or Fantasy Novel: Broken Skies, Keren Landsman, Sial Publishing

=== 2014 ===
- Best Translated Science Fiction Novel: The Devil's Alphabet, Daryl Gregory Translated by Didi Chanoch, Graff publishing
- Best Translated Fantasy Novel: Going Postal, Terry Pratchett Translated by Vered Tochterman, Opus press
- Best Translated YA Book: The Amazing Maurice and His Educated Rodents, Terry Pratchett Translated by Yonatan Bar, Sial Publishing
- Best Original Science Fiction or Fantasy Short Story: Whiskey in a Jar, Rotem Baruchin Published in "Once upon a future"
- Best Original Science Fiction or Fantasy Novel: Every Story is a Sudden Cat, Gabriella Avigur Rotem Kinneret Zmora Bitan Publishing

=== 2013 ===
- Best Translated Science Fiction Novel: Tower of Glass, Robert Silverberg Translated by Omer Kabir, Moby Dick publishing
- Best Translated Fantasy Novel: A dance with dragons, George R.R. Martin Translated by Tzafrir Grosman, Opus publishing
- Best Translated YA Book: Mockingjay, Suzanne Collins Translated by Yael Achmon, Kinneret Zmora Bitan Publishing
- Best Original Science Fiction or Fantasy Short Story: Cappuccino, To Go, Rotem Baruchin Published in "Once upon a future" vol. 4
- Best Original Science Fiction or Fantasy Novel: Demons in Agripas Street, Hagai Dagan Kinneret Zmora Bitan Publishing

=== 2012 ===
- Best Translated Science Fiction Novel: Catching Fire, Suzanne Collins Translated by Yael Achmon, Kinneret Publishing
- Best Translated Fantasy Novel: The Son of Neptune, Rick Riordan Translated by Yael Achmon, Graff publishing
- Best OriginalScience Fiction or Fantasy Short Story (joint win):
  - And then there was winter, Hadas Misgav Published in Don't Panic! Online magazine
  - Alone, in the dark, Keren Landsman Published as part of the online anthology “The World of Susan”, Meorot convention website.
- Best Original Science Fiction or Fantasy Novel What if (Herzl said), Yoav Avni, Zmora-Bitan Publishing

=== 2011 ===
- Best Translated Science Fiction Novel: The Hunger Games, Suzanne Collins Translated by Yael Achmon, Kinneret Publishing
- Best Translated Fantasy Novel: I Shall Wear Midnight, Terry Pratchett Translated by Yonatan Bar, Kidmat Eden Publishing
- Best Original SF&F Short Story: The Heisenberg Gorgon, Keren Landsman Published in Don't Panic! Online magazine
- Best Original SF&F Novel: Mesopotamia – Silence of the Stars, Yehuda Israely & Dor Raveh Am-Oved Publishing

=== 2010 ===
- Best Translated Science Fiction Novel: Isaac Asimov's Collected Short Stories– Vol. I, Isaac Asimov Translated by Rami Shalhevet, Moby Dick Publishing
- Best Translated Fantasy Novel: Nation, Terry Pratchett Translated by Yonatan Bar, Kidmat Eden Publishing
- Best Original SF&F Short Story: Dr. Watson & Mr. Holmes – or – The Curse of the Penningtons, Vered Tochterman Published in “Once upon a future” anthology, Vol 1
- Best Original SF&F Novel: To Be (Chong Levi's Fifth), Yoav Avni, Kinneret Zmora-Bitan Publishing

=== 2009 ===
- Best Translated Science Fiction Novel: This Immortal, Roger Zelazny Translated by Raz Greenberg, Moby Dick Publishing
- Best Translated Fantasy Novel: A Hatful of Sky, Terry Pratchett Translated by Yonatan Bar, Kidmat Eden Publishing
- Best Original SF&F Short Story: The Phoenix Planet, Yael Michaeli Published in Don't Panic! Online Magazine
- Best Original SF&F Novel: Hydromania, Asaf Gavron Keter Publishing

=== 2008 ===
- Best Translated Science Fiction Novel: I Am Legend, Richard Matheson. Translated by Yael Inbar, Yanshuf Publishing.
- Best Translated Fantasy Novel: The Wee Free Men, Terry Pratchett. Translated by Yonatan Bar, Kidmat Eden Publishing.
- Best Translated YA or Children SF&F Book: Harry Potter and the Deathly Hallows, J. K. Rowling. Translated by Gili Bar-Hillel Semo, Yediot Books Publishing.
- Best Original SF&F Short Story: Where Books are Lost, Lili Daie. Published in Don't Panic! Online Magazine
- Best Original SF&F Novel: The Water Between the Worlds, Hagar Yanai. Keter Publishing
- Best Translation of a SF&F book: Gili Bar-Hillel Semo for translating the book: Harry Potter and the Deathly Hallows by J. K. Rowling, Yediot Books Publishing

=== 2007 ===
- Best Translated Science Fiction Novel: Old Man's War, John Scalzi Translated by Raz Greenberg, Yanshuf Publishing
- Best Translated Fantasy Novel: Jonathan Strange & Mr. Norrell, Susanna Clarke Translated by Vered Tochterman, Yanshuf Publishing
- Best Original SF&F Short Story: In the Mirror, Rotem Baruchin The Tenth Dimension Magazine, issue 29
- Best Original Novel: The Whale of Babylon, Hagar Yanai Keter Publishing

=== 2006 ===
- Best Translated Science Fiction Novel: Spin, Robert Charles Wilson Translated by Didi Chanoch, Graff Publishing
- Best Translated Fantasy Novel: Anansi Boys, Neil Gaiman Translated by Vered Tochterman, Opus Press
- Best Original SF&F Short Story: East of Eden, Hagay Averbuch The Israeli Society for SF&F Online Magazine

=== 2005 ===
- Best Translated Science Fiction Novel: Childhood's End, Arthur C. Clarke Translated by Didi Chanoch, Yanshuf Publishing
- Best Translated Fantasy Novel: Transformation, Carol Berg Translated by Didi Chanoch, Graff Publishing
- Best Original SF&F Short Story: The Perfect Girl, Guy Hasson Chalomot Be'aspamia magazine
- Best Original Novel: End's World, Ofir Touche Gafla Keter Publishing

=== 2004 ===
- Best Translated Science Fiction Novel: Warchild, Karin Lowachee Translated by Inbal Sagiv, Opus Press
- Best Translated Fantasy Novel: Smoke and Mirrors, Neil Gaiman Translated by Yael Achmon, Opus Press
- Best Original SF&F Short Story: Dragon Checkpoint, Rami Shalheveth The Tenth Dimension magazine

=== 2003 ===
- Best Translated Science Fiction Novel: Solaris, Stanislaw Lem Translated by Aharon Hauptman, Keter publishing house
- Best Translated Fantasy Novel: American Gods, Neil Gaiman Translated by Rechavia Berman, Opus Press
- Best Original SF&F Short story: All-of-Me(TM), Guy Hasson Chalomot Beaspamia magazine
- Best Original SF&F Novel: Sometimes It's Different, Vered Tochterman Opus Press

=== 2002 ===
- Best Translated Science Fiction Novel: Fahrenheit 451, Ray Bradbury Translated by Noa Manheim, Odyssey Publishing House
- Best Translated Fantasy Novel: A Storm of Swords, George R. R. Martin Translated by David Chanoch, Opus Press
- Best Original SF&F Short Story: Me and Grandma Go Shopping, Hamutal Levin Bli Panika

=== 2001 ===
- Best Translated Science Fiction Novel: Ender's Shadow, Orson Scott Card Translated by Rechavia Berman, Opus Press
- Best Translated Fantasy Novel: The Anubis Gates, Tim Powers Translated by Vered Tochterman, Opus Press

=== 2000 ===
- Best Translated Science Fiction Novel: Dune: House Atreides, Brian Herbert, Kevin J. Anderson Translated by Dorit Landes, Am Oved Publishing House.
- Best Translated Fantasy Novel: Stardust, Neil Gaiman Translated by Ornit Shachar, Opus Press.

=== 1999 ===
- Best Translated Science Fiction Novel: Pastwatch, Orson Scott Card Translated by Rechavia Berman, Opus Press.
- Best Translated Fantasy Novel: Swords and Deviltry, Fritz Leiber Translated by Adva Zeltser, Opus Press.
