= Yoav Avni =

Israeli writer

- יואב אבני
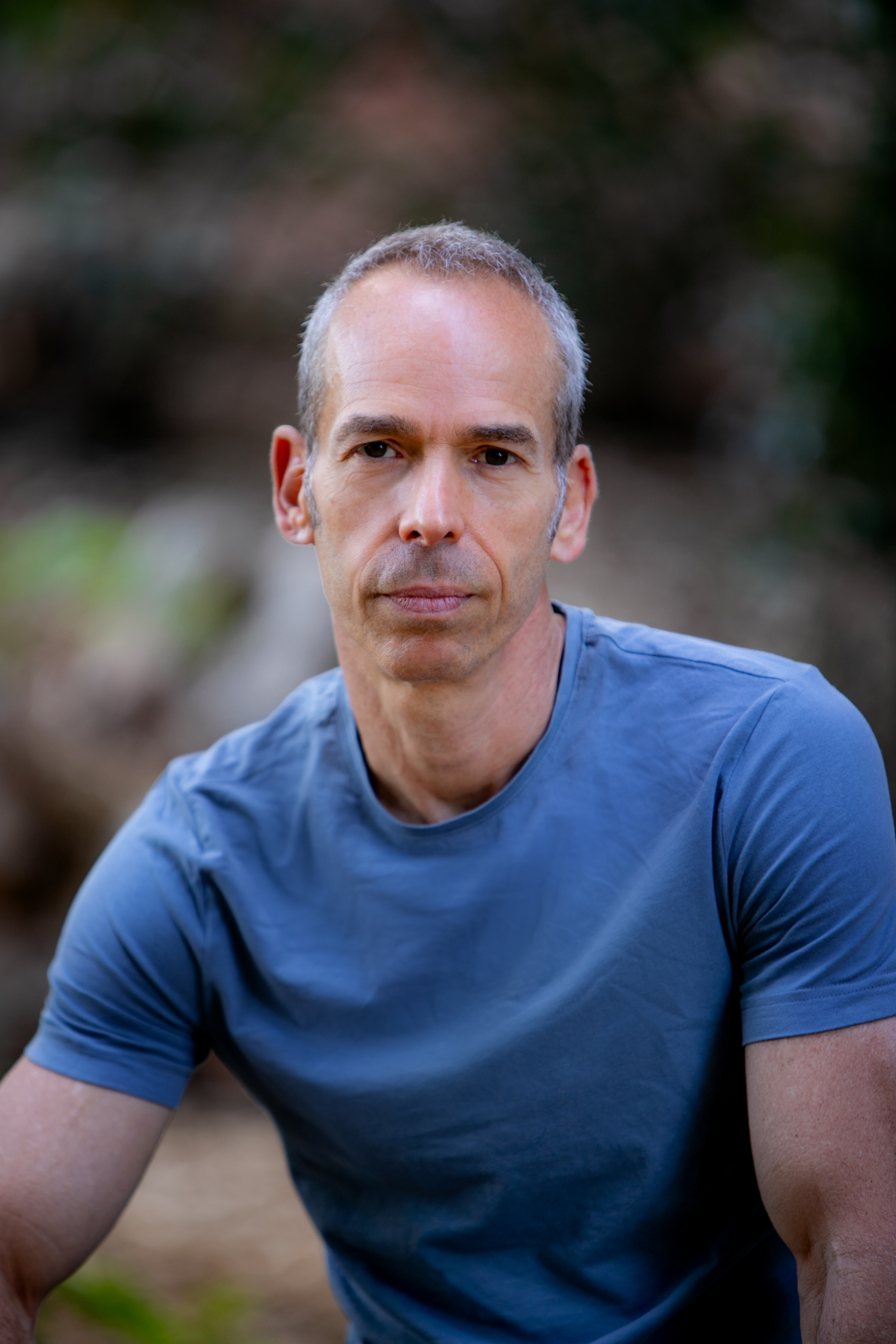
- Yoav Avni, 2015
- Born: Yoav Avni; November 24, 1969 (age 56); Givatayim, Israel
- Occupations: Author translator
- Writing career
- Language: Hebrew
- Genre: Fiction
- Notable works: Herzl Amar (Herzl Said); Shlosha Dvarim l'Yi Boded (Three Things for a Desert Island); HaHamishit Shel Chong Levi (Chong Levi's Fifth)
- Notable awards: Geffen Award (2010,2012)
- Website: www.yoavavni.com

Yoav Avni (Hebrew: יואב אבני; born November 24, 1969) is an Israeli author, translator, editor, and writing mentor. His fiction incorporates elements of speculative fiction, science fiction, and magical realism. Avni is a two-time winner of the Geffen Award for Best Original Science Fiction or Fantasy Novel.

== Biography ==
Avni holds a bachelor's degree in economics and management from Tel Aviv University and a master's degree in communications from Clark University. He lives in Tel Aviv.

=== Literary career ===
Avni's first book, the short-story collection Those Strange Americans (Hebrew: איזה מטומטמים האמריקאים), was published by Tamuz in 1995. His short fiction has also appeared in literary journals, anthologies, and magazines in Israel and abroad, including Moznaim, Utopia, Hayo Yihye, Words Without Borders, JewishFiction.net, Jewcy, and the London-based N-Zine.

His first novel, Three Things for a Desert Island (Hebrew: שלושה דברים לאי בודד), was published by Kinneret Zmora-Bitan in 2006 and became a bestseller in Israel.

Chong Levi's Fifth (Hebrew: החמישית של צ'ונג לוי) was published by Kinneret Zmora-Bitan in 2009. It won the 2010 Geffen Award for Best Original Science Fiction or Fantasy Novel.

Herzl Said (Hebrew: הרצל אמר) was published by Kinneret Zmora-Bitan in 2011. It won the 2012 Geffen Award for Best Original Science Fiction or Fantasy Novel.

Crossing a River Twice (Hebrew: לחצות נהר פעמיים) was published by Kinneret Zmora-Bitan in 2016. An English-language edition is scheduled for publication by Roundfire Books in 2027.

Avni's first young-adult novel, When the World Turned Over (Hebrew: כשהעולם התהפך), was published by Keter in 2022. It was selected for the Israeli Ministry of Education's recommended reading program, approved for Israel's national Culture Basket program, and shortlisted for the 2023 Geffen Award.

Time Clocks (Hebrew: שעוני נוכחות) was published by Keter in Israel in January 2025. An English-language edition is scheduled for publication in the United Kingdom and the United States by Roundfire Books on September 29, 2026.

In December 2025, Avni published I, Director's Cut (Hebrew: אני, גרסת הבמאי), his eighth book, as part of Ivrit's Kolot series. The book is a first-person memoir.

Avni's children's book Alef BeKislul (Hebrew: א׳ בכסלול) is scheduled for publication during the 2026–2027 school year as part of PJ Library Israel, by HaMavoch Publishing.

A new adult novel by Avni is scheduled for publication by Keter in 2027–2028.

=== Translations ===
Avni translates both classic and contemporary literature from English into Hebrew. His translations include Charles Kingsley's The Water-Babies, Richard Adams' Watership Down, Gerald Durrell's My Family and Other Animals, Mary Norton's The Borrowers and Bed-Knob and Broomstick, and J. M. Barrie's Peter Pan.

=== Books ===
- Those Strange Americans (איזה מטומטמים האמריקאים) - Tamuz, 1995
- Three Things for a Desert Island (שלושה דברים לאי בודד) - Kinneret Zmora-Bitan, 2006
- Chong Levi's Fifth (החמישית של צ'ונג לוי) - Kinneret Zmora-Bitan, 2009
- Herzl Said (הרצל אמר) - Kinneret Zmora-Bitan, 2011
- Crossing a River Twice (לחצות נהר פעמיים) - Kinneret Zmora-Bitan, 2016
- When the World Turned Over (כשהעולם התהפך) - Keter, 2022
- Time Clocks (שעוני נוכחות) - Keter, 2025
- I, Director's Cut (אני, גרסת הבמאי) - Ivrit, Kolot series, 2025
- Alef BeKislul (א׳ בכסלול) - PJ Library Israel / HaMavoch Publishing, forthcoming during the 2026–2027 school year

=== Awards and recognition ===
- 2010 - Geffen Award for Best Original Science Fiction or Fantasy Novel, Chong Levi's Fifth.
- 2012 - Geffen Award for Best Original Science Fiction or Fantasy Novel, Herzl Said.
- 2023 - When the World Turned Over was shortlisted for the Geffen Award, selected for the Israeli Ministry of Education's recommended reading program, and approved for Israel's national Culture Basket program.
