= Lavie Tidhar =

Israeli writer (born 1976)

- לביא תדהר
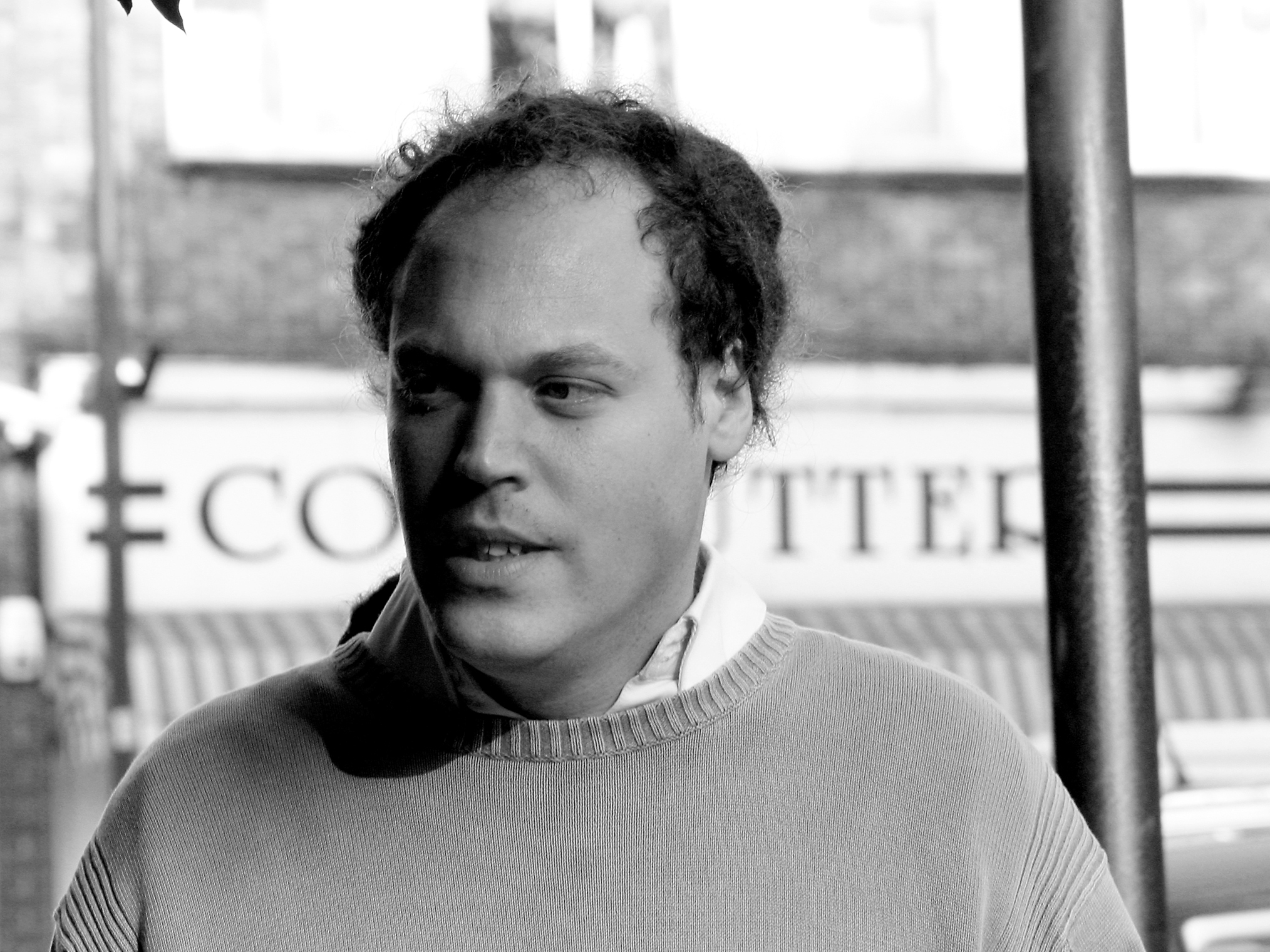
- Born: 16 November 1976 (age 50); Dalia, Northern District, Israel
- Citizenship: Israel; South Africa; United Kingdom
- Occupations: Author, editor
- Writing career
- Language: English
- Years active: 2003–present
- Genres: Fantasy, science fiction, slipstream
- Subjects: speculative fiction; world science fiction; alternate history; Jewish themes
- Notable works: Osama; The Violent Century; A Man Lies Dreaming; Central Station
- Notable awards: World Fantasy Award—Novel (2012); Jerwood Fiction Uncovered Prize (2015); John W. Campbell Memorial Award for Best Science Fiction Novel (2017); Philip K. Dick Award Special Citation (2022); Deutscher Krimi Preis (2025)
- Website: lavietidhar.wordpress.com

Lavie Tidhar (Hebrew: לביא תדהר; born 16 November 1976) is an Israeli-born writer, working across multiple genres. He has lived in the United Kingdom and South Africa for long periods of time, as well as Laos and Vanuatu. As of 2013, Tidhar has lived in London. His novel Osama won the 2012 World Fantasy Award—Novel, beating Stephen King's 11/22/63 and George R. R. Martin's A Dance with Dragons. His novel A Man Lies Dreaming won the £5000 Jerwood Fiction Uncovered Prize, for Best British Fiction, in 2015. He won the John W. Campbell Memorial Award for Best Science Fiction Novel in 2017, for Central Station and received the Philip K. Dick Award Special Citation, for The Escapement, in 2022. Maror won the prestigious Deutscher Krimi Preis in 2025 for Best International Crime novel.

From October 2019 to August 2022, Tidhar, along with Silvia Moreno-Garcia, was the science fiction and fantasy columnist for The Washington Post. The two had previously edited The Jewish Mexican Literary Review together, an online magazine which ran for 3 issues. Since 2023 he has been writing short animated films for director Nir Yaniv under their shared label, Positronish. With Jared Shurin he edits Shelfies, a newsletter dedicated to celebrating the books on people's shelves.

== Biography ==
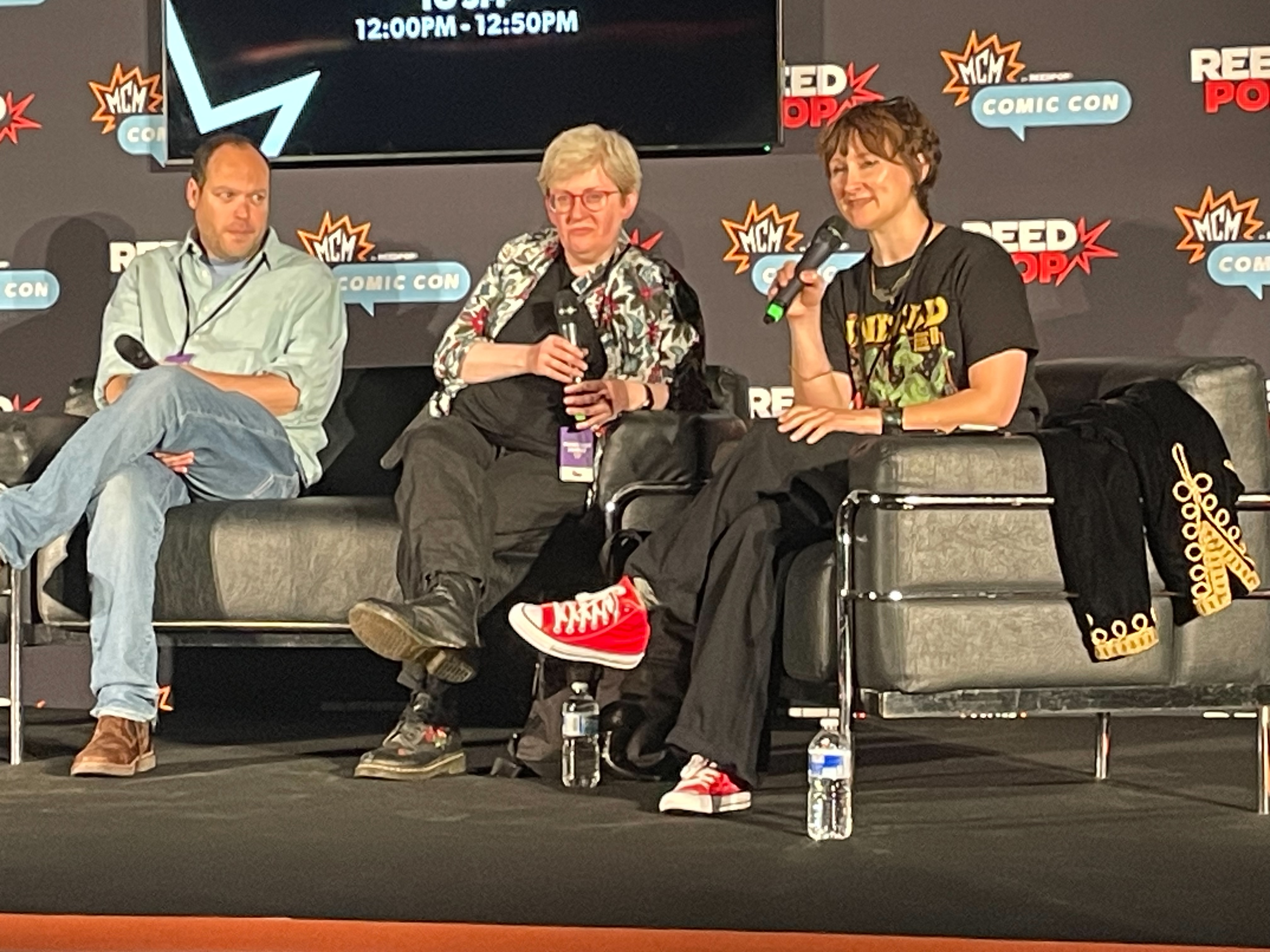
Stark Holborn, Una McCormack, and Lavie Tidhar at the panel A Guide To SFF at MCM London Comic Con in May 2023.

Tidhar was born and raised on Kibbutz Dalia in northern Israel. He began to travel extensively from the age of 15 and incorporates his experiences as a traveler into several of his works.

== Awards and recognition ==
- 2026 Prix ActuSF de l'uchronie, shortlisted for The Vanishing Kind.
- 2025 Deutscher Krimi Preis, Best International Novel, winner, for Adama.
- 2025 Seiun Award, Best Translated Novel category, shortlisted for Neom.
- 2025 Children's Book Council Teacher Favorites Award for 3rd-5th grade, for The Children's Book of the Future.
- 2025 Children's Book Council Librarian Award for 3rd-5th grade, for The Children's Book of the Future.
- 2024 BSFA Award nominee, Best Collection, for The Best of World SF: Volume 3.
- 2023 Locus Award nominee, Best SF Novel, for Neom.
- 2023 Dragon Award nominee, Best SF Novel, for Neom.
- 2023 Locus Award nominee, Best Anthology, for The Best of World SF: Volume 2.
- 2022 Locus Award nominee, Best Anthology, for The Best of World SF: Volume 1.
- 2022 Philip K. Dick Award Special Citation, for The Escapement.
- 2021 Prix ActuSF de l'uchronie winner, for Unholy Land.
- 2021 Prix Planète SF winner, for Unholy Land.
- 2021 British Fantasy Award nominee, Best Fantasy Novel, for By Force Alone.
- 2021 Eugie Award nominee, for "Judge Dee and the Limits of the Law".
- 2021 Chinese Nebula (Xingyun) Award, Best Translated Fiction winner, for Central Station.
- 2020 Stabby Award nominee, Best Short Fiction, for "Judge Dee and The Limits of the Law".
- 2020 Theodore Sturgeon Award, finalist for New Atlantis.
- 2020 Seiun Award, Best Translated Novel category, shortlisted for A Man Lies Dreaming
- 2019–2020 Fantastic Book Awards, nominated for Candy.
- 2019 CWA Short Story Dagger, shortlisted for "Bag Man" (in The Outcast Hours, edited by Mahvesh Murad and Jared Shurin).
- 2019 John W. Campbell Memorial Award for Best Science Fiction Novel nominee, for Unholy Land.
- 2019 Dragon Award for Best Alternate History Novel nominee, for Unholy Land.
- 2019 Premio Kelvin 505, Best Translated Novel nominee, for Central Station.
- 2019 Locus Award, shortlisted for Unholy Land.
- 2019 Kurd Laßwitz Award nominee, Best Foreign Novel, for Central Station.
- 2019 Premio Italia nominee, Best International Novel, for Central Station.
- 2019 Geffen Award nominee, Best Translated SF Novel, for A Man Lies Dreaming.
- 2019 Kitschies Award nominee, Best Novel, for Unholy Land.
- 2018 Sidwise Award nominee, Long Form, for Unholy Land.
- 2018 The Neukom Institute Literary Arts Award for Speculative Fiction, winner, for Central Station.
- 2018 Geffen Award nominee, Best Translated SF Book, for Central Station.
- 2017 John W. Campbell Memorial Award for Best Science Fiction Novel winner, for Central Station.
- 2017 Locus Award, shortlisted for Central Station.
- 2017 Arthur C. Clarke Award, shortlisted for Central Station.
- 2016 Premio Roma, Best Foreign Fiction category, shortlisted for A Man Lies Dreaming.
- 2016 Seiun Award, Best Translated Novel category, shortlisted for The Violent Century.
- 2016 International Dublin Literary Award, longlisted for A Man Lies Dreaming.
- 2015 Jerwood Fiction Uncovered Prize winner, for A Man Lies Dreaming.
- 2015 British Fantasy Award nominee, Best Novel, for A Man Lies Dreaming
- 2015 British Fantasy Award nominee, Best Collection, for Black Gods Kiss
- 2015 Gaylactic Spectrum Award nominee, Best Novel, for The Violent Century
- 2015 International Dublin Literary Award, longlisted for The Violent Century.
- 2012 World Fantasy Award winner, Best Novel, for Osama.
- 2012 British Fantasy Award winner, Best Novella, for Gorel & The Pot-Bellied God.
- 2012 BSFA Award winner, Non-Fiction, for The World SF Blog.
- 2012 John W. Campbell Memorial Award nominee, Best Novel, for Osama.
- 2012 Sidewise Award nominee, Long Form, for Camera Obscura.
- 2012 BSFA Award nominee, Best Novel, for Osama.
- 2012 Kitschies nominee, Best Novel, for Osama.
- 2011 World Fantasy Award nominee, Special Award – Non Professional, for the World SF Blog.
- 2011 Theodore Sturgeon Award nominee, Best Short Story, for "The Night Train".
- 2011 Airship Award nominee, Best Novel, for Camera Obscura.
- 2011 Geffen Award nominee, Best Novel, for The Tel Aviv Dossier (with Nir Yaniv)
- 2010 Last Drink Bird Head Award Winner, for the World SF Blog
- 2010 Geffen Award nominee, Best Novel, for Retzach Bidyoni (with Nir Yaniv)
- 2009 WSFA Small Press Award nominee, Best Short Story, for "Hard Rain at the Fortean Cafe"
- 2006 Geffen Award nominee, Best Short Story, for "Poter Ta'alumot Be'chesed"
- 2003 Clarke-Bradbury International Science Fiction Competition winner, for short story, "Temporal Spiders, Spatial Webs"

== Published works ==
=== Novels ===
- Osama, P S Publishing, 2011 (UK).
- The Violent Century, Hodder & Stoughton, 2013 (UK) / Tachyon Publications, 2019 (US).
- A Man Lies Dreaming, Hodder & Stoughton, 2014 (UK) / Melville House, 2016 (US).
- Central Station, Tachyon Publications, 2016.
- Unholy Land, Tachyon Publications, 2018.
- By Force Alone, Head of Zeus, 2020 (UK) / Tor, 2020 (US).
- The Hood, Head of Zeus, 2021.
- The Escapement, Tachyon Publications, 2021.
- Neom, Tachyon Publications, 2022.
- The Circumference of the World, Tachyon Publications, 2023.

Literary / Historical Fiction

The Maror Trilogy

- Maror, Head of Zeus, 2022.
- Adama, Head of Zeus, 2023.
- Golgotha, Head of Zeus, September 2025.
- Six Lives, Apollo, 2024.

Children's Books

- Candy, Scholastic, 2018 (UK), Peachtree, 2020 (US, as The Candy Mafia)
- The Children's Book of the Future (2024), DK Books (with Richard Watson)

==== Others ====
- Tidhar, Lavie; Nir Yaniv (2009). The Tel Aviv dossier : a novel. Toronto: ChiZine Publications.
- Tidhar, Lavie (2013). Martian sands. Hornsea, England: P S Publishing.

The Bookman Histories

- The Bookman. Angry Robot Books, 2010.
- Camera Obscura. Angry Robot Books, 2011.
- The Great Game. Angry Robot Books, 2012.

=== Novellas ===
- An Occupation of Angels. United Kingdom: Pendragon Press 2005. United States: Apex Publications 2010.
- Cloud Permutations. United Kingdom: PS Publishing 2010.
- Gorel and The Pot-Bellied God. United Kingdom: PS Publishing 2011.
- Jesus & The Eightfold Path. United Kingdom: Immersion Press 2011.
- Lust of the Swastika. United Kingdom: PS Publishing 2014.
- The Vanishing Kind. First published in The Magazine of Fantasy & Science Fiction 2016. E-book edition published by Jabberwocky 2018.
- New Atlantis. First published in The Magazine of Fantasy & Science Fiction 2019. E-book edition published by Jabberwocky 2020.
- The Big Blind. United Kingdom: PS Publishing 2020.
- Quincey. United Kingdom: NewCon Press, 2026.

=== Collections ===
- HebrewPunk. United States: Apex Publications. 2007. A collection of four linked short stories re-imagining pulp fantasy in Jewish terms.
- Black Gods Kiss. United Kingdom: PS Publishing. 2015. A collection of five linked short works (including one novella) related to Tidhar's previous British Fantasy Award-winning novella Gorel and the Pot-Bellied God (2011). (The title makes reference to the C.L. Moore short story "Black God's Kiss".)
- Terminale Terra. Italy: Future Fiction, 2018. Collection of several SF short stories, in Italian translation.
- Venus in Bloom. Japan: Hal-Con, 2019. Guest of honour collection published to coincide with Hal-Con 2019, collecting several SF short stories, in dual English and Japanese. Illustrated by Masato Hisa.
- The Lunacy Commission. US: Jabberwocky, 2021. A collection of linked short stories featuring Wolf/Hitler from A Man Lies Dreaming and set in the two years preceding the events of the novel.
- No One Hears The Last Shot. United Kingdom: PS Publishing. 2025. A collection of ten crime and noir short stories.
- The Three Coffin Problem. US: Jabberwocky, 2026. Nine linked short stories, most previously published online, concerning Tidhar's medieval vampire Judge Dee

=== Comics ===
- "The Butcher & The Fly-Keeper: A Christmas Love Story", in Murky Depths #6, 2008, 6pp strip with artist Thomas Tuke.
- "Finger", in Murky Depths #10, 2009, 3pp strip with artist Neil Roberts.
- "Mr. Spellman's Last Dance", in Grave Conditions, ed. Scott Nicholson, 2010, 6pp strip with artist Andre Siregar.
- "Mr. Spellman's Holiday", in Murky Depths #13, 2010, 9pp strip with artist Andre Siregar.
- Adolf Hitler's "I Dream of Ants!". United Kingdom: House of Murky Depths, 2012. With artist Neil Struthers.
- A Man Named Wolf. Hodder & Stoughton 2014. Special promotional comic. With artist Neil Struthers.
- "New Swabia" in Outside. Berlin: Ash Pure and Topics Press, 2017. 10pp strip with artist Sarah Anne Langton.
- Adler #1. Titan Comics 2020. With artist Paul McCaffrey.
- Adler #2. Titan Comics 2020. With artist Paul McCaffrey.
- Adler #3. Titan Comics 2020. With artist Paul McCaffrey.
- Adler #4. Titan Comics 2020. With artist Paul McCaffrey.
- Adler #5. Titan Comics 2020. With artist Paul McCaffrey.

=== Picture books ===
- Going to the Moon. United Kingdom: House of Murky Depths, 2012. With artist Paul McCaffrey.

=== As editor ===
==== The Apex Book of World SF Series ====
A series of anthologies published since 2009, collecting short stories of international speculative fiction. Tidhar edited the first three volumes, and remained as overall Series Editor from the fourth volume.

- The Apex Book of World SF. United States: Apex Publications. 2009.
- The Apex Book of World SF 2. United States: Apex Publications. 2012.
- The Apex Book of World SF 3. United States: Apex Publications. 2014.

As Series Editor

- The Apex Book of World SF 4. United States: Apex Publications, 2015. Edited by Mahvesh Murad.
- The Apex Book of World SF 5. United States: Apex Publications, 2018. Edited by Cristina Jurado.

==== The Best of World SF ====
In 2021, Tidhar began a new series with The Best of World SF, published in hardcover by Head of Zeus.

- The Best of World SF: Volume 1. United Kingdom: Head of Zeus, 2021.
- The Best of World SF: Volume 2. United Kingdom: Head of Zeus, 2022.
- The Best of World SF: Volume 3. United Kingdom: Head of Zeus, 2023.

==== Jews vs... Series ====
- Jews vs Zombies. With Rebecca Levene. United Kingdom: Jurassic London, 2015.
- Jews vs Aliens. With Rebecca Levene. United Kingdom: Jurassic London, 2015.

==== Other ====
- A Dick & Jane Primer for Adults. United Kingdom: British Fantasy Society Publications, 2008

=== Short stories ===
==== Selected anthologies ====
- "The Green Caravanserai" - Out of the Ruins, edited by Preston Grassman, Titan Books, 2021
- "Widow Maker" - The Book of Magic, edited by Gardner Dozois, HarperVoyager 2018
- "Talking to Ghosts at the End of the World" - Infinity's End, edited by Jonathan Strahan, Solaris Books 2018
- "Waterfalling" - The Book of Swords, edited by Gardner Dozois, Bantam Books 2017
- "The Drowned Celestrial" – Old Venus, edited by George R. R. Martin and Gardner Dozois, Bantam 2015
- "The Night Train" – Strange Horizons, 2010. Reprinted in both Gardner Dozois's The Year's Best Science Fiction: Twenty Eighth Annual Collection and in Jonathan Strahan's The Best Science Fiction and Fantasy of the Year: Volume 5.
- "The Spontaneous Knotting of an Agitated String" – Fantasy Magazine 2010. Reprinted in Gardner Dozois's The Year's Best Science Fiction: Twenty Eighth Annual Collection
- "The Integrity of the Chain" – Fantasy Magazine, 2009. Reprinted in Gardner Dozois' The Year's Best Science Fiction: Twenty Seventh Annual Collection
- "Set Down This" – Phantom, edited by Sean Wallace and Paul G. Tremblay, Prime Books 2009
- "One Day, Soon" – Lovecraft Unbound, edited by Ellen Datlow, Dark Horse Comics 2009
- "Shira" – The Del Rey Book of Science Fiction & Fantasy, edited by Ellen Datlow, Del Rey 2008
- "My travels with Al-Qaeda" – Salon Fantastique, edited by Ellen Datlow and Terri Windling, Thunder's Mouth Press 2006
- "Bophuthatswana" – Glorifying Terrorism, edited by Farah Mendlesohn, 2007

==== Selected stories in online magazines ====
- "Joiner and Rust", Tor.com / Reactor, 2026
- "The Swap", Apex Magazine, 2025
- "The Robot", Uncanny Magazine, 2024
- "The Blaumilch", Clarkesworld Magazine, 2023
- "Unboxing", Apex Magazine, 2023
- "The Ghasts", Uncanny Magazine, 2023
- "Seven Vampires: A Judge Dee Mystery", Tor.com, 2022
- "The Ghasts", Uncanny Magazine, 2023
- "Junk Hounds", Clarkesworld Magazine, 2022
- "Schlafstunde", Apex Magazine, 2022
- "It Happened in ‘Loontown", Apex Magazine, 2022
- "Rain Falling in the Pines", Clarkesworld Magazine, 2021
- "Judge Dee and the Poisoner of Montmartre", Tor.com, 2021
- "Judge Dee and the Three Deaths of Count Werdenfels", Tor.com, 2021
- "Judge Dee and the Limits of the Law", Tor.com, 2020
- "Blue and Blue and Blue and Pink", Clarkesworld Magazine, 2020
- "In Xanadu", Tor.com, 2019
- "Venus in Bloom", Clarkesworld Magazine, 2019
- "Svalbard", PuzzleTales.com, 2019
- "Gubbinal", Clarkesworld Magazine, 2018
- "Yiwu", A Tor.com Original, 2018
- "The Old Dispensation", Tor.com, 2017
- "Terminal", A Tor.Com Original, 2015
- "Selfies", Tor.com, 2014
- "Dragonkin", Tor.com, 2013
- "Spider's Moon", Futurismic, 2009
- "304, Adolf Hitler Strasse", Clarkesworld Magazine, 2006
- "The Dope Fiend", Sci Fiction, 2005

==== The "Central Station" story cycle ====
Inspired by authors like Cordwainer Smith, C. L. Moore, Clifford D. Simak, Philip K. Dick and Zenna Henderson. Several of Tidhar's short stories relate to one another in the following chronological order, according to the author:

- "Under the Eaves", Robots: The Recent A.I., 2012 (Dozois’ Year's Best, Horton's Year's Best)
- "Robotnik", Dark Faith II, 2012
- The Smell of Orange Groves, Clarkesworld Magazine, 2011 (Dozois’ Year's Best, Strahan's Year's Best, Polish translation)
- "Crabapple", Daily Science Fiction, 2013
- The Lord of Discarded Things, Strange Horizons, 2012
- "Filaments", Interzone, 2013
- Strigoi. Interzone, 2012
- "The Book Seller". Interzone, 2013
- "The God Artist", unpublished as of February 2013
- "The Core", Interzone, 2013
- "The Birthing Clinics", unpublished as of February 2013

"Substantively different" versions of these stories form the basis of the fix-up novel Central Station.

=== Short fiction ===
| Title | Year | First published | Reprinted/collected | Notes |
|---|---|---|---|---|
| The indignity of rain | 2012 | Tidhar, Lavie (2012). "The indignity of rain". Interzone. | | The "Central Station" story cycle |
| Murder in the cathedral | 2014 | Tidhar, Lavie (June 2014). "Murder in the cathedral". Asimov's Science Fiction. 38 (6): 80–105. | | |
| Needlework | 2013 | Tidhar, Lavie (March 2013). "Needlework". Asimov's Science Fiction. 37 (3): 48–53. | | |
| The Oracle | 2013 | Tidhar, Lavie (September 2013). "The Oracle". Analog Science Fiction and Fact. 133 (9): 37–47. | | The "Central Station" story cycle |
| Vladimir Chong chooses to die | 2014 | Tidhar, Lavie (September 2014). "Vladimir Chong chooses to die". Analog Science Fiction and Fact. 134 (9): 40–47. | | The "Central Station" story cycle |
| Whaliens | 2014 | Tidhar, Lavie (April 2014). "Whaliens". Analog Science Fiction and Fact. 134 (4): 54–63. | | |

=== Non-fiction ===
- Art and War. Co-written with Shimon Adaf. United Kingdom: Repeater Books, 2016.

== Filmography ==
Short Animated Film

| Year | Title | Director | Writer | Producer |
|---|---|---|---|---|
| 2023 | Welcome To Your A.I. Future | No | Yes | Yes |
| 2023 | Loontown | No | Yes | Yes |
| 2024 | The Radio | No | Yes | Yes |
| 2026 | Io | No | Yes | Yes |

Short Form Animated Series

| Year | Title | Director | Writer | Executive producer | Creator |
|---|---|---|---|---|---|
| 2024 | Mars Machines | No | Yes | Yes | Yes |

== Adaptations ==
Tidhar's Bookman Histories were adapted as a series of dramatised audiobooks by GraphicAudio.

== In popular culture ==
Tidhar is referenced in several works of fiction:

- In Adam Roberts's Jack Glass (2012), "Tidharian" is referred to as a futuristic spoken language. "It was English Dia was speaking, after all: not Potpourri or Tidharian or Pidgin-Martian."
- In Christopher Farnsworth's Killfile, the Mossad agent friend of the protagonist is named Tidhar after the author (though it is briefly mentioned he has a different first name). "I am on guard, because Tidhar is no one you want to mess with, even by accident." ... "Thanks to Tidhar, I'm piggybacking on Mossad tech." .... "I should tell Tidhar, if I ever see him again..."
- In the Shimon Adaf short story "third_attribute", the protagonist visits Tidhar's childhood home as he contemplates writing a thesis on Tidhar's Hebrew poetry. "He wanders along the Kibbutz pathways, but doesn’t become any wiser. A battered copy of Remnants of God, Tidhar’s only poetry book in Jewish [Jewish? He knew Jewish once!] held under his arm."
- In Nick Wood's Azanian Bridges (2016), Tidhar's Osama is mentioned as a banned book in the alternate history South Africa of the novel.
- In Charlie Kaufman's Antkind (2020), protagonist B. Rosenberger Rosenberg is portrayed as a former fan of Tidhar (along with Isaac Asimov and Harlan Ellison) turned against him. ""Yes," she screams, "Tidhar! You loved Tidhar!"" ... "I try to call after her, but I cannot. I cannot be a man who countenances Tidhar."
