= Osama (novel) =

2011 alternate history novel by Lavie Tidhar

- Cover of Osama
- Author: Lavie Tidhar
- Language: English
- Genre: Alternate History, Metafiction
- Publisher: PS Publishing
- Publication date: 2011
- Media type: Book

Osama is a 2011 alternate history metafictional novel by Lavie Tidhar. It was first published by PS Publishing.

== Synopsis ==
In a world without terrorism, a private detective is hired to locate Mike Longshott, the mysterious author of a popular series of novels about a vigilante named "Osama bin Laden".

== Reception ==
Osama won the 2012 World Fantasy Award for Best Novel.

Publishers Weekly described it as "offbeat and enigmatic", but with "less than rigorous internal logic".

The Guardian saw conceptual parallels to Philip K. Dick's The Man in the High Castle, emphasizing that Tidhar's goal is to "show that behind every manufactured enemy, is a real human being".

in Locus, Gary K. Wolfe observed that although Longshott is supposed to be a pulp fiction writer, the excerpts of Longshott's works (depicting various real-world instances of terrorism) "aren’t pulpish at all" but rather are "rendered in a crisp, journalistic prose" — unlike the rest of the novel, which is in a "deliberately pulp-noir style". Strange Horizons noted the possibility that "the entire story may be little more than [the detective's] opium-induced hallucination."
