= Avi Katz =

American-born Israeli illustrator and cartoonist

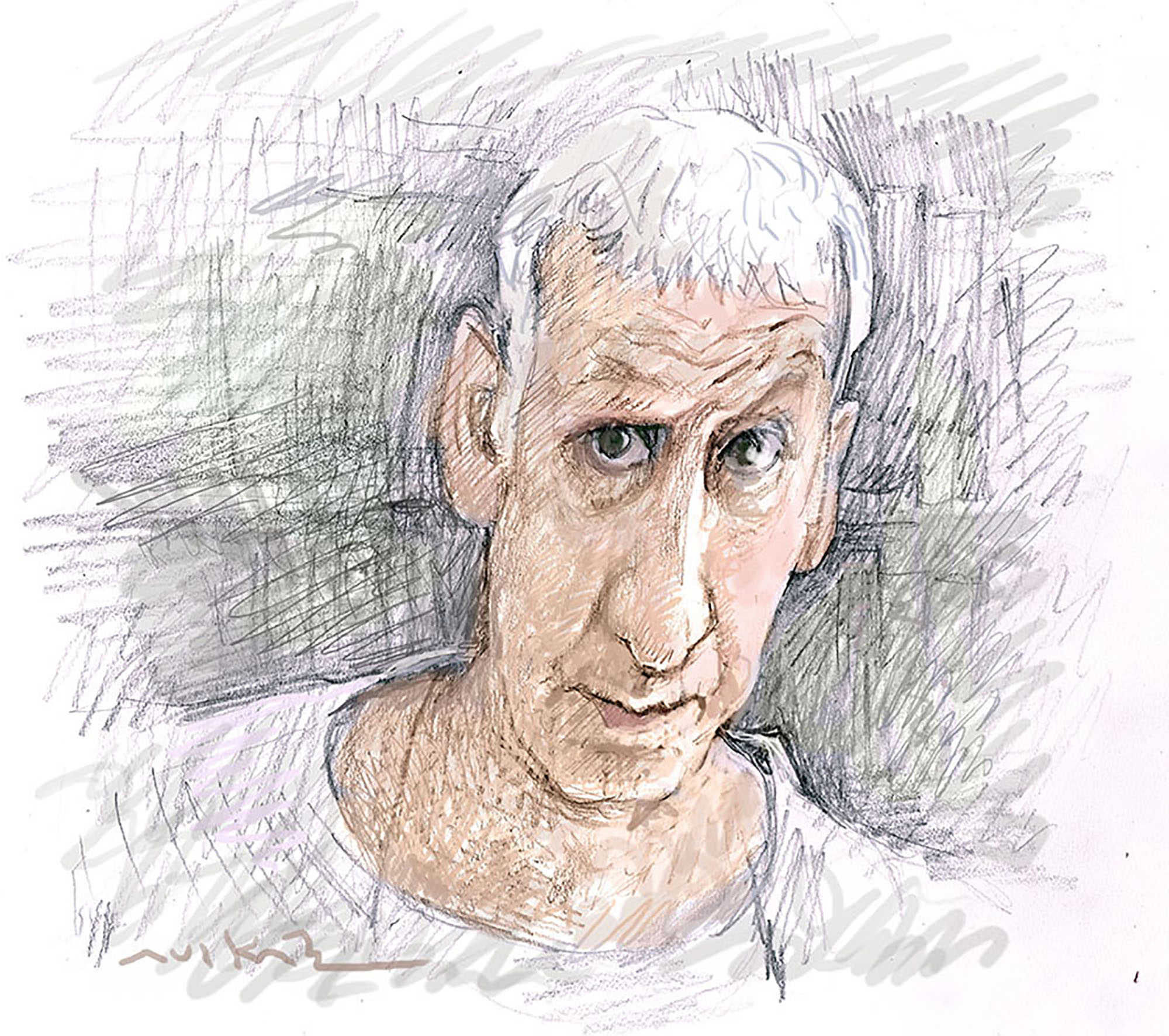

Avi Katz (Hebrew: אבי כץ; born 1949) is an Israeli illustrator and cartoonist.

== Early life and education ==
Katz was born in Philadelphia, PA, USA. Throughout his years as a student in the Jewish day school system (Solomon Schechter and Akiba), he studied art at the Fleisher Art Memorial. He studied for three years at the University of California, Berkeley, exhibiting two one-man shows, and in 1970 transferred to the Bezalel Academy of Arts and Design in Jerusalem, Israel. After graduating in Fine Arts in 1973, he decided to make his home permanently in Israel.

== Career ==
After several years of teaching and exhibiting paintings, Katz opted for illustration as a full-time career. In the ensuing years he has illustrated some 160 books in Israel and the United States, most of them realistically drawn novels for young readers on real-life and historical subjects. Eight of his books won Israel's Ze'ev Prize, and four received International Board on Books for Young People Hans Christian Andersen Honors. In 2009, his JPS Illustrated Bible, authored by Ellen Frankel, won the 2009 National Jewish Book Award for Illustrated Children's Book and was a Sidney Taylor Notable Book; The Waiting Wall was also a Taylor Notable. He is a member of Society of Children's Book Writers and Illustrators and the Israel Association of Illustrators.

Throughout the 1980s, Katz illustrated for the Davar daily until its demise, and for the short-lived The Nation, creating daily comic strips in both. From its first issue in 1990, he has been the staff artist of the bi-weekly news magazine The Jerusalem Report. Around 2014, the Jerusalem Report was making cuts to its staff and expenses, and Avi Katz was regretfully dropped from the publication. So many readers protested that he was reinstated, and he returned to great acclaim. He is a member of the Israel Society of Caricaturists and regularly exhibits in the Holon Museum of Cartoons and Comics. He is also active in the Cartooning for Peace program and has exhibited with this group around the world.

Katz is a long-time science fiction and fantasy fan and is active in the Israeli Society for SF&F. He created all the cover paintings for the society's quarterly, The Tenth Dimension, and has exhibited his art at WorldCon. Katz lives in Ramat Gan, Israel.

In 2018, Katz was fired by The Jerusalem Post shortly after publishing a cartoon of Benjamin Netanyahu, depicting him and his entourage as pigs. It caused a controversy, viewed as anti-Semitic and shocking, because the pig is not kosher. This decision was met with protests from his colleagues, who expressed support of the cartoonist. He was rehired as the cartoonist for The Jerusalem Report in September, 2023.

== Awards ==
His awards include the IBBY Hans Christian Andersen Award (four times) and Israel’s Ze'ev Prize for children's and youth literature (eight times).

- 2010: National Jewish Book Awards for “JPS Illustrated Children’s Bible,” by Ellen Frankel; Avi Katz, illus. (Jewish Publication Society, 2009) in category "Illustrated Children’s Books"
- The book My Journey with Alex by Ruth Almog illustrated by Avi Katz had won the Andersen Award, the Ze'ev Prize and the Yad Vashem Prize, as well as a UNESCO commendation
