= Nir Yaniv =

Israeli musician

- ניר יניב
- Born: 1972 (age 53–54); Jerusalem, Israel
- Occupations: Author, editor, musician
- Writing career
- Genre: Science fiction

Nir Yaniv (Hebrew: ניר יניב; born 1972) is an Israeli multidisciplinary artist.

He was active early on as a science fiction editor in Israel. In 2000 he founded the webzine of the Israeli Society for Science Fiction and Fantasy, and in 2007 he became chief editor of Chalomot Be'aspamia, Israel's only professionally printed SF&F magazine.

As an author, Yaniv's short fiction has appeared in Weird Tales, Apex Magazine, The Best of World SF and others. He collaborated with World Fantasy Award winning author Lavie Tidhar on two novels, including the "deranged sci-fi extravaganza" (per The Jewish Quarterly) The Tel Aviv Dossier and released the English language collection The Love Machine & Other Contraptions. Yaniv returned to fiction publishing in 2024 with the novel The Good Soldier, an " amiable satire of the gung-ho heroics of military sci-fi".

Yaniv has been active as a musician from early on, initially with the Israeli jazz-funk band Plutonium and more recently with the Emmy Award winning soprano Hila Plitmann. He released several independent albums, including "the first Hebrew-language SF Music themed album", The Universe in a Pita.

From 2013 he has also been making short films as a writer/director, including the animated Liftoff, a "touching, hand-illustrated piece of a man’s journey to the moon". Welcome To Your A.I. Future (2023) dealing with emergent A.I. technology, was featured in New Scientist. Loontown (also 2023), imagines "a Dystopian Los Angeles populated by sentient Balloons".

== Fiction ==
=== In Hebrew ===
- Ktov Ke'shed Mi'shachat (One Hell of a Writer). Israel: Odyssey Press, 2006. A short story collection.
- Retzach Bidyoni (Fictional Murder). Israel: Odyssey Press, 2009. A novel, with Lavie Tidhar.
- Melech Yerushlaim (King of Jerusalem). Israel: Yaniv Publishing, 2019. a novel.

=== In English ===
- The Tel Aviv Dossier. Canada: ChiZine Publications, 2009. A novel, with Lavie Tidhar.
- The Love Machine & Other Contraptions. UK: Infinity Plus Books, 2012. A short story collection.
- The Good Soldier. Canada: Shadowpaw Press, 2024. Novel.

=== Selected Short Stories ===
- "A Wizard on the Road". Shimmer Magazine, 2006
- "The Dream of the Blue Man". Weird Tales, September 2008
- "A Painter, a Sheep, and a Boa Constrictor". Shimmer Magazine, 2009. Reprinted in The Year's Best Science Fiction & Fantasy: 2010 ed. Rich Horton (2010).
- "Benjamin Schneider’s Little Greys". Apex Magazine, November 2009. Reprinted in The Best of World SF, ed Lavie Tidhar (2021).
- "The Believers". Chizine, March 2010. Reprinted in Zion's Fiction: A Treasury of Israeli Speculative Literature, ed. Lottem & Teitelbaum.
- "Undercity". Apex Magazine, August 2012.

== Music ==
- The Universe in a Pita: a Hebrew science fiction rock album.
- Funkapella: a concept-album using vocals and drums only, with no other instruments.
- Happiness is Real: a live dance and music performance with choreographer and dancer Ilanit Tadmor.
- The Voice Remains

== Filmography ==
Short film

Year	Title	Director	Writer	Producer
2013	MicroTime	Yes	Yes	Yes
2017	Addict	Yes	Yes	Yes

Animated short film

Year	Title	Director	Writer	Producer
2014	Liftoff	Yes	Yes	Yes
2018	Memories of a Third Planet	Yes	Yes	Yes
2023	Welcome To Your A.I. Future	Yes	No	Yes
2023	Loontown	Yes	No	Yes
2024	The Radio	Yes	No	Yes
2026	Io	Yes	No	Yes

Short Form Animated Series

Year	Title	Director	Writer	Executive producer	Creator
2024	Mars Machines	Yes	No	Yes	Yes
