= Vered Tochterman =

- ורד טוכטרמן
- Born: October 24, 1970 (age 55)
- Citizenship: Israeli
- Occupations: Novelist, short story person, translator
- Writing career
- Language: Hebrew, English
- Genre: Science fiction
- Notable work: Lifamim Ze Acheret (Sometimes It's Different)
- Notable awards: Geffen Award

Vered Tochterman (Hebrew: ורד טוכטרמן; born October 24, 1970) is an Israeli author, translator and editor of science fiction and fantasy.

Among her works is a short story collection Lifamim Ze Acheret (Sometimes It's Different), published by Opus Press in 2002, for whom she received the Israeli Geffen Award in 2003 as well as an array of short stories published in various magazines in Israel. Several of them were the winners of the ISSF short stories contest over the years.

Tochterman edited the Israeli SF&F magazine Chalomot Be'aspamia (“Idle dreams”) in the years 2002-2006.

One of her stories, Hunting a Unicorn, appeared in the December 2003 issue of The Magazine of Fantasy & Science Fiction.
