= ICon festival =

ICon Festival פסטיבל אייקון

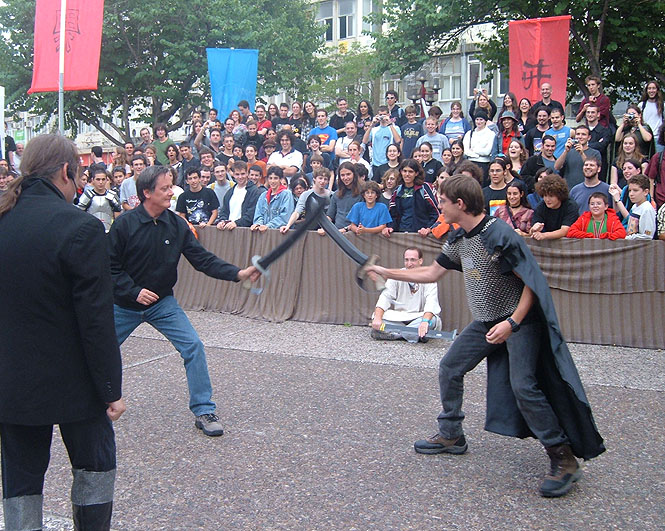
Author Tim Powers fights at the battle ring. ICon 2005

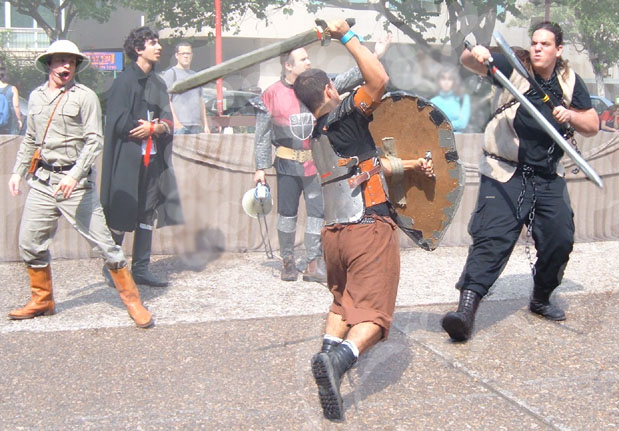
A battle at the "Colosseum" battle ring at Icon 2005

ICon Festival (Hebrew: פסטיבל אייקון) is an Israeli science fiction and fantasy fan convention held annually in the Tel Aviv Eshkol Pais during the Sukkot holiday in September–October. Venues in previous years included the adjacent Cinematheque, Eeroni Aleph school and ZOA house. The first ICon was held in autumn 1998. ICon is normally three days long, though in previous years it featured a parallel film festival which lasted longer.

The title is a contraction of "Israeli Convention". Graphically, "IC" resembles the first letter of the festival's name in Hebrew, hence the capitalization.

ICon features a plethora of talks on subjects including literature, science, television, films, specific fandoms and general genre theory as well as writing and art workshops and a host of role-playing games. The convention encourages cosplay, and includes a masquerade event. It normally features an original film, play or musical created by Israeli science fiction fans. ICon 2013 featured over 270 such events over the 3.5 day period. Rather than a dealers' room, ICon features a dealers' court through the festival lobby and the outdoors areas of the venue. The festival usually features a battle ring where costumed LARP players and visitors can battle against each other with soft simulated weapons.

The annual Geffen Award ceremony for Hebrew and translated science fiction and fantasy literature has been held at ICon since 1999.

The venue consists of the Eshkol Pais building, which features talks, a makeshift "café" rest area, a tabletop games room and some of the dealers' court including a second-hand booth where visitors deposit used goods for sale. The Eeroni Aleph adjacent school is used for roleplaying games and allows out-of-town visitors to sleep inside for the duration of the night. Nearby venues, such as ZOA, are sometimes used as well on busier years.

Past guests and guests of honor include authors Orson Scott Card, Guy Gavriel Kay, Steven Brust, Neil Gaiman, Daryl Gregory and Brandon Sanderson, as well as actor Chase Masterson and others.

Each ICon is centered on a main theme. Themes in past years include identity, discovery, rejuvenation, "beyond the mirror" and cities.

The festival is completely volunteer-based. Its organizers are all nonprofit organizations. The year 2013 saw over 250 volunteers (including staff) running ICon.

Over the years ICon was held by Israeli Society for Science Fiction and Fantasy and Israeli Roleplaying Association, along with the Starbase 972 Star Trek fan club and others.

Since 2010, due to dispute among festival organizers, the festival was split to two festivals: "ICon", organized by the Israeli Society for Science Fiction and Fantasy and held in the Eshkol Pais in Tel Aviv, and "Utopia" (previously "Icon TLV") at the Cinematheque in Tel Aviv.
