= Richard Thaler =

American economist and Nobel Laureate (born 1945)

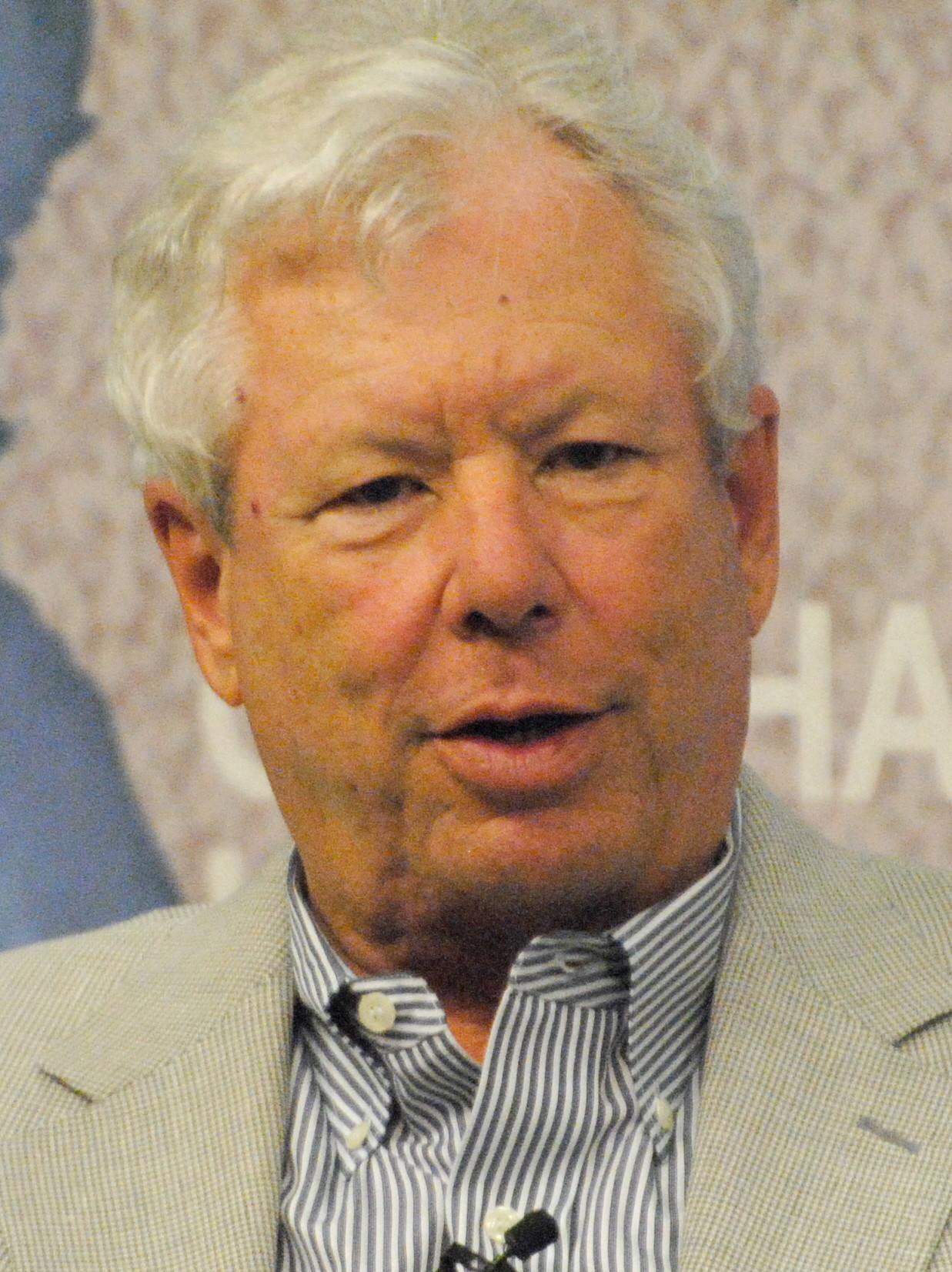
- Thaler in 2015
- Born: September 12, 1945 (age 81); East Orange, New Jersey, U.S.
- Education: Case Western Reserve University (BA); University of Rochester (MA, PhD)
- Spouse: France Leclerc
- Children: 3
- Awards: Nobel Memorial Prize in Economic Sciences (2017)
- Scientific career
- Fields: Behavioral economics, Behavioral finance, Nudge theory
- Workplaces: University of Rochester; Cornell University; University of Chicago
- Thesis: The Value of Saving a Life: A Market Estimate (1974)
- Doctoral advisor: Sherwin Rosen

Richard H. Thaler (/ˈθeɪlər/; born September 12, 1945) is an American economist and the Charles R. Walgreen Distinguished Service Professor of Behavioral Science and Economics at the University of Chicago Booth School of Business. In 2015, Thaler was president of the American Economic Association.

Thaler is a theorist in behavioral economics. He has collaborated with Daniel Kahneman, Amos Tversky, and others in further defining that field. In 2018, he was elected a member in the National Academy of Sciences.

In 2017, he was awarded the Nobel Memorial Prize in Economic Sciences for his contributions to behavioral economics. In its announcement, the Royal Swedish Academy of Sciences stated that his "contributions have built a bridge between the economic and psychological analyses of individual decision-making. His empirical findings and theoretical insights have been instrumental in creating the new and rapidly expanding field of behavioral economics."

== Personal life ==
Thaler was born in East Orange, New Jersey, to a Jewish family. His mother, Roslyn (née Melnikoff) was a teacher, and later a real estate agent while his father, Alan Maurice Thaler, was an actuary at the Prudential Financial in Newark, New Jersey, and was born in Toronto. He has three children from his first marriage and is now married to France Leclerc, a former marketing professor at the University of Chicago and avid photographer.

== Education ==
Thaler graduated from Newark Academy, before going on to receive his B.A. degree in 1967 from Case Western Reserve University, and his M.A. in 1970 and Ph.D. degree in 1974 from the University of Rochester, writing his thesis on "The Value of Saving A Life: A Market Estimate" under the supervision of Sherwin Rosen. He also studied under departmental chair and neoclassicist Richard Rosett, whose wine-buying habits were featured in his research on behavioral economics.

== Academic career ==
After completing his studies, Thaler began his career as a professor at the University of Rochester.

Between 1977 and 1978, Thaler spent a year at Stanford University collaborating and researching with Daniel Kahneman and Amos Tversky, who provided him with the theoretical framework to fit many of the economic anomalies that he had identified, such as the endowment effect.

From 1978 to 1995, he was a faculty member at the SC Johnson College of Business at Cornell University. Cornell established in 1989 the Center for Behavioral Economics and Decision Research, with Thaler as founding director.

After gathering some attention with a regular column in the respected Journal of Economic Perspectives (which ran between 1987 and 1990) and the publication of these columns by Princeton University Press (in 1992), Thaler was offered a position at the University of Chicago's Booth School of Business in 1995, where he has taught ever since.

== Major works and contributions ==
=== Endowment effect ===
Thaler’s studies involving the endowment effect showed that people tend to be neutral towards something if it's not theirs but will pay more money for it if it’s theirs. People rate possessions they own more than possessions they do not own even if these possessions are identical to each other. The traditional economics theory would state that human decisions would be entirely dependent on market value.

=== Mental accounting ===
Mental accounting is a concept introduced by Thaler to illustrate how people perceive and manage money differently based on its source. We often categorize our money into separate “mental accounts” for various purposes, like our salaries, savings, or unexpected funds like tax refunds and gifts. This can sometimes lead to some puzzling or unexpected financial decisions. For instance, someone might splurge on a luxury item with their tax refund but hesitate to spend the same amount from their regular paycheck. Likewise, a person might be frugal with their savings but quickly blow through a bonus. Thaler demonstrated that these mental accounts significantly influence how we budget, save, and decide to spend. Grasping the concept of mental accounting sheds light on why people sometimes behave in ways that traditional economic theories struggle to explain. It also highlights how even minor changes in how money is labeled or presented can sway our choices.

=== Myopic loss aversion (MLA) ===
Thaler, together with Benartzi, demonstrated how myopic loss aversion, wherein investor behavior is guided by their aversion to loss over a shorter time horizon, contributes to equity premium puzzles because they tend to underinvest due to loss aversion related to shorter time horizons, even though equity returns have outperformed bonds. The study combined finance and psychology in the behavioral methods of portfolio management.

=== Choice architecture and libertarian paternalism from nudge ===
Thaler brought forth the concept of choice architecture, which revolves around how the presentation of options can influence the decisions we make. By organizing choices in specific ways, we can guide people toward making better decisions without infringing on their freedom. This notion is part of what Thaler refers to as libertarian paternalism. Take, for instance, how many companies automatically enroll their employees in retirement savings plans. Most individuals remain enrolled simply because it’s the default option, which ultimately helps them save more for the future. Of course, they still have the choice to opt out if they wish. Another example is the simplification of health insurance plans, making it easier for people to identify the best options for their needs. Choice architecture can also be applied in various fields like energy consumption, organ donation, and education. Thaler’s research demonstrates that even minor adjustments in how choices are presented can lead to significant changes in behavior, enabling people to make better decisions while still preserving their freedom to choose.

== Writings ==
=== Books ===
Thaler has written a number of books intended for a lay reader on the subject of behavioral economics, including Quasi-rational Economics and The Winner's Curse, the latter of which contains many of his Anomalies columns revised and adapted for a popular audience. One of his recurring themes is that market-based approaches are incomplete: he is quoted as saying, "conventional economics assumes that people are highly-rational—super-rational—and unemotional. They can calculate like a computer and have no self-control problems."

Thaler is coauthor, with Cass Sunstein, of Nudge: Improving Decisions About Health, Wealth, and Happiness (Yale University Press, 2008). Nudge discusses how public and private organizations can help people make better choices in their daily lives. "People often make poor choices—and look back at them with bafflement!" Thaler and Sunstein write. "We do this because, as human beings, we all are susceptible to a wide array of routine biases that can lead to an equally wide array of embarrassing blunders in education, personal finance, health care, mortgages and credit cards, happiness, and even the planet itself." Thaler and his co-author coined the term "choice architecture".

Thaler advocates for libertarian paternalism, which describes public and private social policies that lead people to make good and better decisions through "nudges" without depriving them of the freedom to choose or significantly changing their economic incentives. An example of this is the choice of default options in retirement savings plans. When joining the plan is made the default, roughly 90 percent of those eligible participate, much higher than if they have to actively join. However, Thaler and Sunstein argue that changing the default to agreeing to organ donation is not an effective policy for increasing organ transplants. Although the default "works" in that almost no one opts out, family members are still consulted before organs are removed, and the lack of an active opt out is (correctly) not considered a strong signal of the potential donor's true preferences. Instead they advocate "prompted choice" (ask for permission prominently) plus "first person consent" which stipulates that the wishes of active donors should be honored.

Thaler and Sunstein updated Nudge in 2021, removing some chapters from the original edition—such as those discussing legal frameworks for recognizing same-sex relationships—and adding new content, including a chapter on what they term "sludge".

While nudges are intended to make good choices easier through thoughtful choice architecture, sludge refers to "any aspect of choice architecture consisting of friction that makes it harder for people to obtain an outcome that will make them better off (by their own lights)." Thaler and Sunstein cite examples like the difficulty of canceling subscriptions compared to signing up, mail-in rebates, and opaque pricing models. These practices are also commonly known as dark patterns.

In 2015 Thaler wrote Misbehaving: The Making of Behavioral Economics, a history of the development of behavioral economics, "part memoir, part attack on a breed of economist who dominated the academy—particularly, the Chicago School that dominated economic theory at the University of Chicago—for much of the latter part of the 20th century."

=== Other writings ===
Thaler gained some attention in the field of mainstream economics for publishing a regular column in the Journal of Economic Perspectives from 1987 to 1990 titled Anomalies, in which he documented individual instances of economic behavior that seemed to violate traditional microeconomic theory.

In a 2008 paper, Thaler and colleagues analyzed the choices of contestants appearing in the popular TV game show Deal or No Deal and found support for behavioralists' claims of path-dependent risk attitudes. He has also studied cooperation and bargaining in the UK game shows Golden Balls and Divided.

As a columnist for The New York Times News Service, Thaler has begun a series of economic solutions for some of America's financial woes, beginning with "Selling parts of the radio spectrum could help pare US deficit", with references to Thomas Hazlett's ideas for reform of the U.S. Federal Communications Commission (FCC) and making television broadcast frequency available for improving wireless technology, reducing costs, and generating revenue for the US government.

He is an advocate for a carbon tax. On the Freakonomics podcast, Steven Levitt laments: "literally every economist I’ve ever known would tell you, 'Of course we should have a tax on carbon. This could not be more obvious.'” Thaler responded: "It is very frustrating because right now in the U.S. the Republicans are opposed to it because it’s a tax and the progressives are against it because they think whatever the tax was, it wouldn’t be high enough and some of the tax would be paid by poor people and they shouldn’t have to pay it. These are silly arguments. Obviously, you can have a carbon tax and distribute the money in a way that is progressive, but we’re united in our opposition to the only chance, really, that the planet has of survival. And I think this is the greatest failing of the economics profession ever. ... Sweden has the highest carbon tax, and lo and behold, emissions have gone way down and the economy is thriving. So, for once economists are right. We don’t know how to control unemployment or recessions or inflation, maybe. But we do know if we raised the price of carbon, people will emit less. Even crazy behavioral economists know that."

== Nobel Memorial Prize in Economics ==
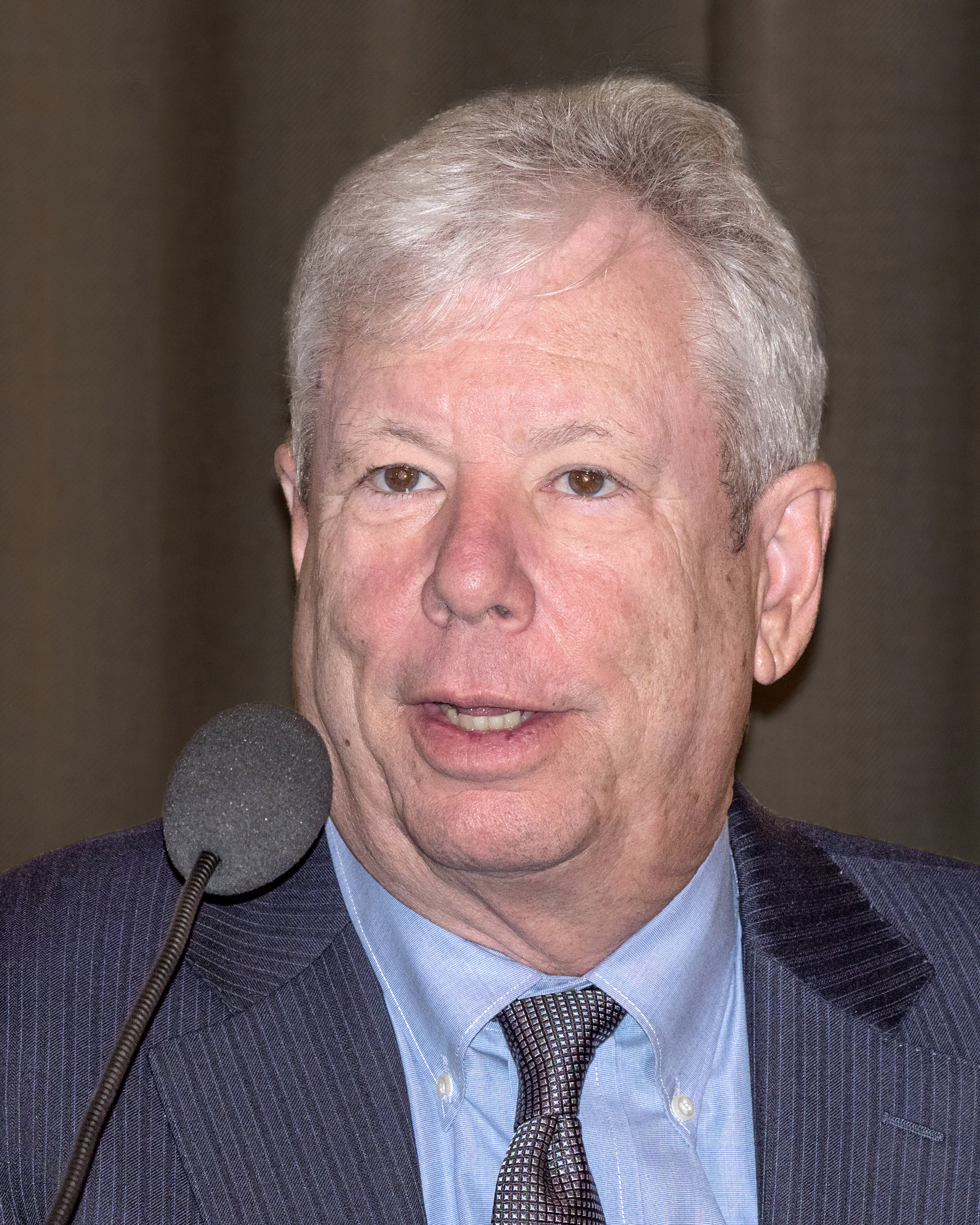
Richard H. Thaler during Nobel Prize press conference in Stockholm, December 2017

Thaler was the 2017 recipient of the Nobel Memorial Prize in Economics for "incorporat[ing] psychologically realistic assumptions into analyses of economic decision-making. By exploring the consequences of limited rationality, social preferences, and lack of self-control, he has shown how these human traits systematically affect individual decisions as well as market outcomes."

"Given the lag between when work is done and when the Nobel Prize is awarded in economics, it would be accurate to say that the prize was largely given for work I did in my Cornell years", Thaler said.

Immediately following the announcement of the 2017 prize, Professor Peter Gärdenfors, Member of the Economic Sciences Prize Committee, said in an interview that Thaler had "made economics more human".

In presenting Thaler with his prize, Nobel economics committee chair Per Strömberg, the Chair of the Economic Sciences Prize Committee stated that the portion of Thaler's work on self-control had "finally liberated Adam Smith". This work was done jointly with economist Hersh Shefrin. Strömberg stated that the two-system planner-doer approach to self-control helps to reconcile the "deep tension between" the two main streams of Smith's work, the first being about moral sentiments and imperfect rationality (Theory of Moral Sentiments, Smith, 1759) and the second being about rational forces and markets (Wealth of Nations, Smith, 1776). The two-system model also provided the theoretical foundation for the nudge approach.

After learning that he had won the Nobel Memorial Prize in Economics, Thaler said that his most important contribution to economics "was the recognition that economic agents are human, and that economic models have to incorporate that." In a nod to the sometimes-unreasonable behavior he has studied so extensively, he also joked that he intended to spend the prize money "as irrationally as possible".

Paul Krugman, the 2008 winner of the Nobel Memorial Prize in Economics, tweeted "Yes! Behaviorial econ is the best thing to happen to the field in generations, and Thaler showed the way." However, Thaler's selection was not met with universal acclaim; Robert Shiller (one of the 2013 laureates and a fellow behavioral economist) noted that there are some economists who still view Thaler's incorporation of a psychological perspective within an economics framework as a dubious proposition. In addition, an article in The Economist simultaneously praised Thaler and his fellow behavioral colleagues while bemoaning the practical difficulties that have resulted from causing "economists as a whole to back away a bit from grand theorising, and to focus more on empirical work and specific policy questions."

In chronicling Thaler's path to Nobel Memorial Prize in Economics laureate, John Cassidy notes that although Thaler's "nudge" theory may not overcome every shortcoming of traditional economics, it has at least grappled with them "in ways that have yielded important insights in areas ranging from finance to international development".

== Other honors and awards ==
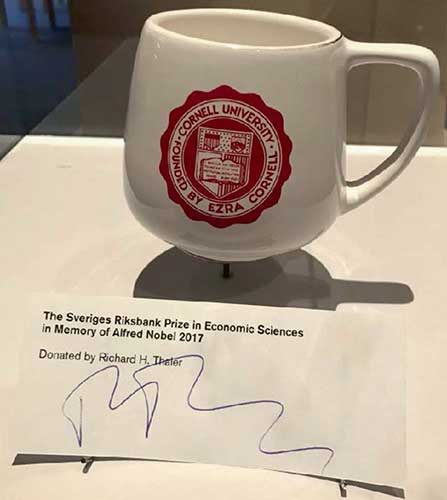
A Cornell University mug used in Thaler's experiments on Endowment Effect, donated to the Nobel Prize Organisation

In addition to earning the Nobel Memorial Prize in Economic Sciences, Thaler holds many other honors and awards. He is a member of the National Academy of Science, the American Academy of Arts and Sciences, a Fellow of the American Finance Association, and more.

== Behavioral finance and other applications in policy ==
Thaler also is the founder of an asset management firm, Fuller & Thaler Asset Management, which believes that investors will capitalize on cognitive biases such as the endowment effect, loss aversion and status quo bias. Since 1999, he has been the Principal of the firm, which he co-founded in 1993 with Russell Fuller. Fuller said of his co-founder that Thaler has changed the economics profession in that "[h]e doesn't write papers that are full of math. He writes papers that are full of common sense."

Thaler co-founded and served with Robert Shiller as the co-director of the National Bureau of Economic Research Behavioral Economics Project from 1991 to 2015.

Thaler was also involved in the establishment of the Behavioural Insights Team, which was originally part of the British Government's Cabinet Office but is now a limited company.

Thaler made a cameo appearance as himself in the 2015 movie The Big Short, which was about the credit and real estate bubble collapse that led to the 2008 financial crisis. During one of the film's expository scenes, he helped pop star Selena Gomez explain the 'hot hand fallacy,' in which people believe that whatever is happening now will continue to happen in the future. As a consequence of his appearance in the film, Thaler has an Erdős–Bacon number of 5.

== Publications ==
=== Books ===
- Thaler, Richard H. 1992. The Winner's Curse: Paradoxes and Anomalies of Economic Life. Princeton: Princeton University Press. ISBN 0-691-01934-7.
- Thaler, Richard H. 1993. Advances in Behavioral Finance. New York: Russell Sage Foundation. ISBN 0-87154-844-5.
- Thaler, Richard H. 1994. Quasi Rational Economics. New York: Russell Sage Foundation. ISBN 0-87154-847-X.
- Thaler, Richard H. 2005. Advances in Behavioral Finance, Volume II (Roundtable Series in Behavioral Economics). Princeton: Princeton University Press. ISBN 0-691-12175-3.
- Thaler, Richard H., and Cass Sunstein. 2009 (updated edition). Nudge: Improving Decisions About Health, Wealth, and Happiness. New York: Penguin. ISBN 0-14-311526-X.
- Thaler, Richard H., and Cass Sunstein. 2021 (final edition). Nudge: Improving Decisions About Health, Wealth, and Happiness. New York: Penguin. ISBN 9780143137009, 9780525508526.
- Thaler, Richard H. 2015. Misbehaving: The Making of Behavioral Economics. New York: W. W. Norton & Company. ISBN 978-0-393-08094-0.

=== Published papers ===
Thaler has published over 90 papers in various sources, namely finance, business, and economic journals. Some of his most cited and influential papers are listed below.

- Kahneman, D., Knetsch, J.L. and Thaler, R.H., 1991. Anomalies: The Endowment Effect, Loss Aversion, and Status Quo Bias. Journal of Economic Perspectives, 5(1), pp. 193–206.
- Benartzi, S. and Thaler, R.H., 1995. Myopic Loss Aversion and the Equity Premium Puzzle. Quarterly Journal of Economics, 110(1), pp. 73–92.
- Thaler, R., 1980. Toward a Positive Theory of Consumer Choice. Journal of Economic Behavior & Organization, 1(1), pp. 39–60.
- Kahneman, D., Knetsch, J.L. and Thaler, R.H., 1990. Experimental Tests of the Endowment Effect and the Coase Theorem. Journal of Political Economy, 98(6), pp. 1325–1348.
- De Bondt, W.F. and Thaler, R., 1985. Does the Stock Market Overreact?. The Journal of Finance, 40(3), pp. 793–805.
- Barberis, N. and Thaler, R., 2003. A Survey of Behavioral Finance. Handbook of the Economics of Finance, 1, pp. 1053–1128.
- Thaler, R., 1985. Mental Accounting and Consumer Choice. Marketing Science, 4(3), pp. 199–214.

== See also ==
- List of Jewish Nobel laureates

Academic offices
Preceded by William Nordhaus	President of the American Economic Association; 2015– 2016	Succeeded by Robert J. Shiller
Awards
Preceded by Oliver Hart; Bengt Holmström	Laureate of the Nobel Memorial Prize in Economics; 2017	Succeeded by William Nordhaus; Paul Romer
