= Richard Watson (author) =

English writer, lecturer and scenario planner

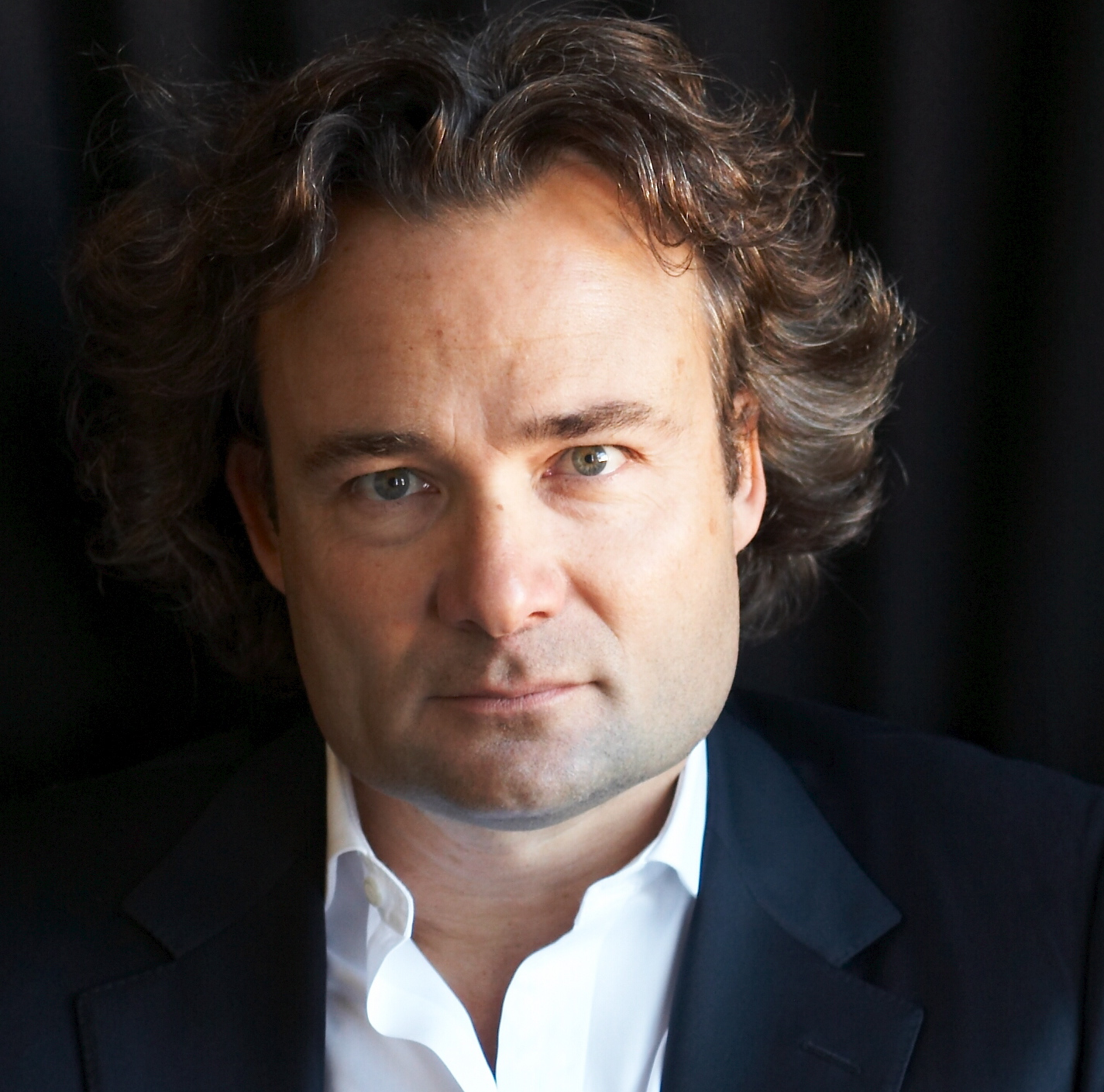
Watson in 2007

Richard Watson (born 1961) is an English author, lecturer and futurist known for his 2007 book Future Files: a Brief History of The Next 50 Years and for his infographics, especially his Trends & Technology Timeline 2010-2050 and his Table of Disruptive Technologies.

He has written six books and contributed to others and is the founder of What's Next, a website that documents global trends.

He has been a blogger on innovation for Fast Company Magazine and has written about creativity, innovation, and future thinking for a variety of publications including Future Orientation (Copenhagen Institute for Future Studies) and What Matters (McKinsey & Company).

He is a proponent of scenario planning and an advocate of preferred futures, believing it is incumbent upon organisations to create compelling visions of the future and work towards their realisation.

In addition to writing, Watson has worked with the Technology Foresight Practice at Imperial College London and Entrepreneurship Centre at the Judge School at Cambridge University. He has also lectured at London Business School and the King's Fund and has worked with the Strategic Trends Unit at the UK Ministry of Defence, the RAND Corporation, CSIRO, the Cabinet Office and the Departments of Education in the UK and Australia.

== Personal life ==
Richard Watson was born in the UK but holds a dual British–Australian citizenship.

== Books ==
- Watson, Richard (2007). Future Files: A Brief History of the Next 50 Years. Melbourne: Scribe Publications. ISBN 978-1921215414. Translated to Hungarian, Korean, Turkish, Croatian, Lithuanian, Portuguese, Arabic, Indonesian, Russian, Persian, Bulgarian, Czech and Thai.
- Watson, Richard (2010). Future Minds: How the Digital Age is Changing Our Minds, Why this Matters and What We Can Do About It. Nicholas Brealey Publishing. ISBN 978-1857884586. Translated to Japanese, Korean, Serbian, Spanish, Thai, Chinese (traditional complex characters).
- Watson, Richard (2012). The Future: 50 Ideas You Really Need to Know. Quercus Science. ISBN 9781780871592.
- Watson, Richard; Freeman, Oliver (2013). Futurevision: Scenarios for the World in 2040. Scribe Publishing. ISBN 978-1922070098.
- Watson, Richard (2016), Digital Vs Human: How We'll Live, Love and Think in the Future. Scribe Publishing. ISBN 978-1-925228-42-7
- Watson, Richard (2024) The Children’s Book of the Future, DK (Dorling Kindersley). ISBN 978-0-7440-9802-0 Contributions
- Various (2017). Future Frontiers: Education for an AI World. Melbourne University Press. ISBN 978-0-522-87311-5
- Various (2019). The Future of Universities Thought Book. University Industry Innovation Network (2019) ISBN 978-94-91901-38-6
- John Schroeter (2020) After Shock: The World’s Foremost Futurists Reflect on 50 Years of Future Shock―and Look Ahead to the Next 50. (2020). John August Media. ISBN 978-0-9997364-4-9
- Campbell, Aifric (2021). The Love Makers. Goldsmiths Press. ISBN 978-1-912685-83-7
