= Misbehaving: The Making of Behavioral Economics =

Book by Richard Thaler

Misbehaving
- Author: Richard Thaler
- Language: English
- Publisher: W. W. Norton & Company
- Publication date: 2015
- Publication place: United States of America
- Media type: Print
- ISBN: 978-0-393-08094-0 (Hardcover)

Misbehaving: The Making of Behavioral Economics is a book by Richard Thaler, economist and professor at the University of Chicago's Booth School of Business and winner of the 2017 Nobel Prize in Economics.

The book builds on Thaler's work as a behavioral economist in trying to present an alternate view point that humans bring along behavioral biases, are error prone, and are not always rational. This view point builds on his work from his previous book, Nudge, published in 2008. Thaler ties this to the effect on markets, which are otherwise expected to be efficient.

Thaler uses the book to talk to readers about how behavioral economic analysis can help look at areas ranging from household finance, to TV shows, National Football League Drafts and emerging disruptive businesses like Uber, in a new light.
