= Washington Square News =

Weekly student newspaper of New York University

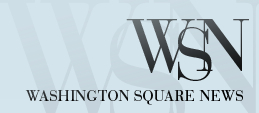
- WSN logo
- Type: Student newspaper
- Format: Berliner
- School: New York University
- Owner: Independent
- Editor-in-chief: Aashna Miharia (2026)
- Founded: 1973; 53 years ago
- Language: English
- Headquarters: New York, New York
- Circulation: 65,000
- Website: nyunews.com

Washington Square News (WSN) is the daily student newspaper of New York University (NYU). It has a circulation of 10,000 and an estimated 55,000 online readers. It is published in print on Monday, in addition to online publication Tuesday through Friday during the fall and spring semesters, with additional issues published in the summer. It serves the NYU, Greenwich Village, and East Village communities in Lower Manhattan, New York City.

== History ==
The newspaper was born in 1973 as the result of NYU's merging of their two campus weeklies: the University Heights campus in the Bronx had published The Heights Daily News, while the Washington Square campus in Lower Manhattan originally published The Washington Square Journal.

Between 2003 and 2004, WSN broke the "Bobst Boy" story.

In 2000, WSN launched its website nyunews.com. In 2017, WSN launched its podcast, "Newsflash", and then rebranded the following year as "Washington Square Noise". In 2018, WSN launched its digital weekly magazine, Under the Arch.

In late September 2020, the entire staff of WSN resigned after disagreements with the university over their faculty advisor. The resignation lasted until the mid March, 2021, when the staff returned after the hiring of a new editor.

== Staff ==
WSN is run solely by NYU students, with the paper's senior staff composed mostly of undergraduates. Its offices are located at 75 Third Avenue. It serves the student population by helping with opportunities for reporting, writing, editing, coding, photography, video production, design, illustration and business.

The paper is editorially and financially independent from the university and is solely responsible in selling advertisements to fund its production, with an average cost of US$350,000 annually.

The term for the positions of editor-in-chief is one academic year, beginning in the summer semester and ending after the spring semester.

== Awards ==
Washington Square News won an Associated Collegiate Press Pacemaker award in 2004, that same year it was awarded the title of Overall Best Newspaper. It won the Pacemaker Award again in 2019.

== Notable former staff ==
- Shaun Assael, author, staff writer at ESPN The Magazine
- Bill Bastone, editor, The Smoking Gun
- Marc H. Bell, CEO of Penthouse Media Group; board of trustees, New York University
- Russell Berman, staff writer, The Atlantic
- Matt Buchanan, executive editor, Eater
- Alvin Chang, head of visuals and data, Guardian US
- Katherine Creag, television reporter, Good Day New York
- Jill Filipovic, author and writer at Feministe
- Bradley Hope, reporter, The Wall Street Journal
- Eileen "E.P." Gunn, 'Eco-Nomics' columnist, TheStreet.com, freelance writer/editor/lecturer
- Annette Heist, senior producer, Gimlet Media
- Tim Herrera, founding editor, The New York Times' Smarter Living
- Eric Kohn, senior editor and chief film critic, Indiewire
- Jessica Letkemann, former editor, billboard.com
- Mark Mueller, former staff writer, Newark Star-Ledger (shares 2005 Pulitzer Prize)
- Jon Mummolo, Princeton University politics professor
- Lindsay Noonan, Writer/Producer at CNN
- Andrew Nusca, executive editor, Morning Brew
- Amy Odell, author and former editor, Cosmopolitan
- Brian O'Keefe, deputy editor, Fortune Magazine
- Kira Peikoff, author, The Unholy Grail
- Adam Playford, editor, The New York Times
- David E. Rovella, managing editor at Bloomberg News, Attorney
- Joel Sherman, sportswriter/columnist, New York Post
- Rachel Holliday Smith, reporter, The City
- Gene Weingarten, Washington Post columnist; 2008, 2010 Pulitzer Prize winner
- Scott Wenger, former managing editor/money & business, New York Daily News, and former editorial director, Barron's
- Sakshi Venkatraman, editor, BBC North America

== See also ==
- List of New York City newspapers and magazines
