= Hofling =

Hofling could refer to:

- Ana Paula Höfling, American dance researcher
- Eckart Höfling, German Catholic priest
- Tom Hoefling, American activist and politician
- Hofling hospital experiment
