= Strip search phone call scam =

Series of phone scams in the United States

The strip search phone call scam was a series of incidents, mostly occurring in rural areas of the United States, that extended over a period of at least ten years, starting in 1994. The incidents involved a man calling a restaurant or grocery store, claiming to be a police officer, and then convincing managers to conduct strip searches of employees (or, in at least two known cases, a customer), and to perform other bizarre and humiliating acts on behalf of "the police". The calls were most often made to fast-food restaurants in small towns.

More than 70 such phone calls were reported in 30 U.S. states. A 2004 incident in Mount Washington, Kentucky led to the arrest of David Richard Stewart. Stewart was acquitted of all charges in the Mount Washington case. He was suspected of making similar scam calls elsewhere but was never charged. Police reported that the scam calls ended after Stewart's arrest.

== Before the Mount Washington incident ==
There were numerous prior incidents in many states that followed the pattern of the fraudulent call to a McDonald's restaurant in Mount Washington, Kentucky. The majority of the calls were made to fast-food chain restaurants, but some were made to grocery stores and video rental stores.

With every hoax, a male caller who identified himself as a police officer or other authority figure would contact a manager or supervisor. He would solicit their help in detaining an employee or customer who was suspected of a crime, such as theft or drug possession. He would then provide a generic description of the suspect (typically a young female employee, but a few victims were male or older) that the manager would recognize, and he would then ask the manager to search the suspected person. The tasks would initially start as strip searches before gradually becoming more invasive and sexual in nature as the "investigation" continued. Eventually, the caller would have groomed the manager to the point where they would do almost anything asked by the caller, such as spanking, kissing, inappropriate touching, oral sex, and even sexual assault and rape. Many of the incidents continued for hours until a participant realized the call was a hoax or a bystander intervened.

Some notable hoaxes were:

- On August 4, 1994, a man claiming to be a sheriff's deputy called a McDonald's restaurant in Saybrook Township, Ohio, stating that a customer's purse was stolen from the restaurant. The caller told two minor females working at the restaurant to allow the manager to strip search them.
- Two calls were reported in 1995: one in Devils Lake, North Dakota, and another in Fallon, Nevada.
- A man claiming to be an Oktibbeha County deputy sheriff called a Pizza Hut in Starkville, Mississippi, and accused an employee of stealing money from a restaurant customer. The manager of the restaurant was summoned to the restaurant in order to strip-search the employee.
- On January 20, 1999, a Burger King manager in Fargo, North Dakota slapped the naked buttocks of a 17-year-old female employee after being instructed by someone on the phone claiming to be a police officer.
- On December 16, 1999, a 16-year-old female server working at a local pizza parlor in Blackfoot, Idaho was taken to the manager's office after a phone call made by an individual only identifying as "Officer Davis" for the Blackfoot Police Department, who accused an employee of stealing a woman's purse with a $50 bill in it earlier that evening. The caller persuaded the manager to strip-search the employee and to provide detailed descriptions of her naked body, including her breasts and genitalia. The incident ended when a 22-year-old male colleague of the victim entered the room and intervened, confronting the "cop" on the phone before the caller hung up.
- On November 30, 2000, a Leitchfield, Kentucky, McDonald's manager undressed herself in the presence of a customer. The caller had convinced her that the customer was a "suspected sex offender" and that the manager, serving as bait, would enable undercover police officers to arrest him.
- In 2001, a Hooters restaurant manager in Charleston, West Virginia told two female employees that a police officer had called the restaurant and reported a stolen change purse. The caller told the women to strip in front of the manager and threatened them with arrest if they did not do so.
- In December 2001, an Indianapolis-area Burger King restaurant's manager strip-searched a part-time, 15-year-old female employee in front of a male co-worker after a call was made to the business by a "policeman" claiming an employee stole a purse. The caller asked for a description of the employee's hair and tan lines. The search was also allegedly conducted in a room where other crew members could observe.
- On May 29, 2002, an 18-year-old female McDonald's employee in Iowa, on her first day on the job, was forced to strip naked, jog in place, and assume several poses at the direction of a caller on the phone.
- In November 2002, a Taco Bell restaurant manager in Statesboro, Georgia received a call from a "detective" claiming that a purse had been stolen from the lobby. The manager then took a 19-year-old female employee (based on the caller's description) to the manager's office, where he stripped the victim of her uniform, reading the clothing tags for the caller on the other end, and put them in a safe. During the incident, at the caller's orders, the manager also forced the employee to exercise before rubbing and inspecting most of her body, including the orifices. The caller claimed this was to see if any sweat had revealed signs of "green residue" on her body, indicating that she had made contact with the supposedly stolen money.
- On January 26, 2003, an Applebee's assistant manager in Davenport, Iowa, subjected a waitress to a 90-minute strip-search after receiving a collect call from someone who purported to be a regional manager for Applebee's.
- In February 2003, a phone call was made to a McDonald's in Hinesville, Georgia. The female manager (who believed she was speaking to a police officer who was with the director of operations for the restaurant's upper management) took a female employee into the women's bathroom and strip-searched her. She also brought in a 55-year-old male janitor, who conducted a body cavity search of the woman to "uncover hidden drugs". The cavity search entailed the janitor digitally probing the employee's vagina. McDonald's and GWD Management Corporation (owner and operator of the involved McDonald's restaurant) were taken to court over the incident. In 2005, John Francis Nangle, a senior judge for the United States District Court for the Eastern District of Missouri, granted summary judgment to McDonald's and denied, in part, a summary judgment to GWD Management. In 2006, the United States Court of Appeals for the Eleventh Circuit affirmed the judgments.
- On June 3, 2003, a Taco Bell manager in Juneau, Alaska received a call from a man who claimed to be working for the company and investigating drug abuse at the restaurant where the manager worked. The manager then picked a 14-year-old female customer, whom he believed to be the suspect, strip-searched the customer and made her perform several lewd acts at the caller's request.
- In another incident on June 5, 2003, a Hardee's manager in Rapid City, South Dakota, was manipulated into strip-searching a female server and holding her against her will in his office for 3 hours after being told by a caller, claiming to be an officer for the city police, that an employee had stolen money from a customer. After searching her and finding no evidence of theft whatsoever, the caller then instructed the manager to check the employee for drugs instead, before telling him to touch intimate areas of the victim's body. She said he made her sit on his lap, touched her breasts and buttocks, and made her kneel in front of him while he looked in her hair, ears, and mouth.
- In July 2003, a Winn-Dixie grocery store manager in Panama City, Florida received a phone call instructing him to bring a female cashier (who matched a description provided by the caller) into an office where she was to be strip-searched. The cashier was forced to undress and assume various poses as part of the search. The incident ended when another manager entered the office to retrieve a set of keys.
- On October 16, 2003, in Salt Lake City, Utah, an Applebee's restaurant shift supervisor strip-searched a 42-year-old waitress after a "police officer" on the phone threatened to arrest staff members if they did not comply with his orders.
- On December 18, 2003, a call was placed to a Blockbuster Video franchise in Bismarck, North Dakota. The caller claimed to be an officer for the local police and accused an employee of theft, stating that the employee could be searched by a manager because of Blockbuster's "privacy policy". A female employee was then taken to the back office where she was subsequently strip-searched both by the manager and a male co-worker.
- In February 2004, four separate Wendy's restaurant branches within Plymouth County, Massachusetts (West Bridgewater, Abington, Whitman, and Wareham), were the targets of a strip-search phone call hoax in the course of a single night.
- On March 22, 2004, a 17-year-old high school student, enjoying lunch with her two friends at a Taco Bell in Fountain Hills, Arizona, was strip-searched by a 39-year-old male manager in the backroom, supposedly at the request of a police officer on the phone.

== The Mount Washington incident ==
On April 9, 2004, a call was made to a McDonald's restaurant in Mount Washington, Kentucky. According to assistant manager Donna Summers, the caller identified himself as a policeman, "Officer Scott". The caller gave Summers a vague description of a slightly built young white woman with dark hair, who was suspected of theft. Summers believed the description provided was that of Louise Ogborn, an eighteen-year-old who was currently on duty at the restaurant.

The police impersonator demanded that Ogborn be searched at the restaurant because no officers were available at the moment to handle such a minor matter. Ogborn was brought into an office and ordered to strip naked, with Summers placing the clothes in a bag and taking them to her car, as instructed. Ogborn then put on an apron to partially cover herself. Kim Dockery, another assistant manager, was present at that time; Dockery believed she was there as a witness to the search.

Dockery left after an hour, and Summers told the caller that she needed to be working at the restaurant's counter. The caller then told Summers to bring in someone whom she trusted to assist with the investigation. Summers first asked Jason Bradley, one of the restaurant's cooks, to watch Ogborn. When the caller told Bradley to remove Ogborn's apron and describe her, Bradley refused but took no further action and left the office. Summers then called her own fiancé, Walter Nix Jr., to help, who went to the restaurant and took over from Summers. After being told that a police officer was on the phone, Nix could be seen obeying the caller's instructions for the next two hours.

Nix removed the apron that Ogborn was wearing and ordered her to dance and perform jumping jacks while she was naked. Nix then ordered her to insert her fingers into her vagina and expose it to him as part of the "search". He also ordered her to sit on his lap and kiss him, and when she refused to do so, he spanked her until she promised to do so. The caller also spoke to Ogborn and demanded that she do as she was told or face worse punishment. Recalling the incident later, Ogborn said: "I was scared for my life."

After Ogborn had been in the office for two and a half hours, she was ordered to perform oral sex on Nix. Summers returned to the office periodically, and during these times, Ogborn was instructed by the caller to cover herself with the apron. The caller then permitted Nix to leave on condition that Summers would find someone to replace him. After Nix left, he called a friend and told him, "I have done something terribly bad."

With Nix having left and short-staffed due to the dinnertime rush, Summers needed someone to take Nix's place in the office. She spotted Thomas Simms, the restaurant's maintenance man, who had stopped in for dessert. She told Simms to go into the office and watch Ogborn. Simms, however, refused to go along with any of the caller's demands. Summers became suspicious and decided to call a higher-level manager (whom the caller had earlier claimed to be speaking to on another phone line).

Speaking with her boss, Summers discovered that she had been sleeping and had not spoken to any police officer. She realized that the call had been fraudulent. The caller then abruptly ended the call. An employee dialed *69 before another call could ring in, thereby obtaining the caller's telephone number. Summers was now hysterical and began apologizing. Ogborn (shivering and wrapped in a blanket) was released from the office after three and a half hours. The police were called to the restaurant; they arrested Nix on a charge of sexual assault and began an investigation to find the perpetrator of the scam call.

The entire incident was recorded by a surveillance camera in the office. Summers watched the tape later that night and, according to her attorney, broke off her engagement with Nix.

=== Investigation, arrest, and trial ===
Mount Washington police, after doing a simple keyword search on the Internet, quickly realized that this was only the latest in a long series of similar incidents spanning about 10 years. None of those incidents had lasted as long or involved as many people as the one at the Mount Washington McDonald's.

Although their initial suspicion was that the call had originated from a pay phone near the McDonald's restaurant (from which the perpetrator could see both the police station and the restaurant), police later determined that the call had originated from a supermarket pay phone in Panama City, Florida. Having learned that the call was made with an AT&T phone card and that the largest retailer of such cards was Walmart, they contacted the police in Panama City.

The Panama City police informed the Mount Washington police that Detective Flaherty in Massachusetts was already conducting an investigation. Several similar scam calls had been placed to Boston-area restaurants, and Flaherty had already pulled surveillance camera footage from a Walmart in Panama City. Following Flaherty's lead, the Mount Washington police used the phone card's serial number to determine it had been purchased at a different Walmart than the one that sold the card used for calls to Massachusetts restaurants.

Using records from the Panama City Walmart, which showed the cash register and the time of purchase for the phone card, Mount Washington police were able to find surveillance camera footage of the purchaser. The Massachusetts investigation had gone cold when their surveillance video failed to show the purchaser: the cameras had been trained on the store's parking lot and not on the cash registers.

The purchaser in the Panama City video was wearing a correctional officer's uniform of the kind used by Corrections Corporation of America, a private security firm. Videos and still photographs from the two Walmarts were compared, and the same man was seen entering and exiting the Panama City Walmart at the time when a phone card was purchased there. Police used these images to produce front-and-back composite images of the suspect. Subsequent queries directed to the private security firm's human resources department led to the identification of the phone card buyer as David R. Stewart—a married man with five children—who was then arrested.

During his questioning by police, Stewart insisted he never had bought a phone card, but detectives found one in his home that had been used to call nine restaurants in the past year—including a call to a Burger King in Idaho Falls, Idaho, on the same day when that restaurant's manager was reportedly duped by a scam call. Police also found in Stewart's home dozens of applications for police department jobs, hundreds of police magazines, and police-style uniforms, guns, and holsters. This was thought to indicate that the suspect had fantasized about being a police officer.

Stewart was extradited to Kentucky to be tried on charges of impersonating a police officer and solicitation of sodomy. If convicted, Stewart could face up to 15 years in prison. On October 31, 2006, he was acquitted of all charges. Both the defense and the prosecution attorneys speculated that a lack of direct evidence, such as a recording of the caller's voice, might have led the jury to find him not guilty.

Stewart remained a suspect in similar cases throughout the United States. Police later stated that after Stewart's arrest, the scam calls stopped.

=== Aftermath ===
Louise Ogborn, the victim, underwent therapy and treatment with medication to address post-traumatic stress disorder and depression. She abandoned her plans to attend the University of Louisville, where she had anticipated becoming a pre-med student. In an interview with ABC News, she said that after the abuse, she "felt dirty" and had difficulty making and maintaining friendships because she wouldn't "allow anyone to get close to" her.

Donna Summers ended her engagement with Nix soon after the incident. She was fired from McDonald's for violating corporate policies prohibiting both strip searches and for allowing a non-McDonald's employee to enter the restaurant's office. Summers entered an Alford guilty plea to a single count of unlawful imprisonment as a misdemeanor and was sentenced to one year probation.

Kim Dockery was transferred to work at another location.

Walter Nix pleaded guilty to sexual abuse, sexual misconduct, and unlawful imprisonment. The judge agreed to a plea deal for Nix in exchange for his testimony against David Stewart. Due to the level and length of his involvement in the physical crimes, Nix was sentenced to five years in prison.

==== Lawsuits ====
Three years after the incident and while still undergoing therapy, Louise Ogborn sued McDonald's for $200 million for failing to protect her during her ordeal. These were her grounds for the suit:

- McDonald's corporate headquarters was aware of the danger of a possible hoax because they had defended themselves against lawsuits over similar incidents at its restaurants in four other states
- McDonald's had been subjected to similar hoaxes at least two years before the Mount Washington incident and they had not taken appropriate action as directed by their own chief of security and as outlined in his memo to McDonald's upper management

Donna Summers also sued McDonald's, asking for $50 million, for failing to warn her about the previous hoaxes.

McDonald's based its defense on four points:

1. Summers deviated from the company's management manual, which prohibits strip-searches, and therefore McDonald's should not be held responsible for any action of Summers outside the scope of her employment;
2. workers' compensation law prohibited employees from suing their employer;
3. Nix, who actually performed the acts, was not a McDonald's employee, and
4. the victim did not remove herself from the situation, contrary to common sense.

The civil trial began September 10, 2007, and ended on October 5, 2007, when a jury awarded Ogborn $5 million in punitive damages and $1.1 million in compensatory damages and expenses. Summers was awarded $1 million in punitive damages and $100,000 in compensatory damages.

The jury decided that McDonald's and the unnamed caller were each 50% at fault for the abuse to which the victim was subjected. McDonald's and its attorneys were sanctioned for withholding evidence pertinent to the outcome of the trial. In November 2008, McDonald's was also ordered to pay $2.4 million in legal fees to plaintiffs' lawyers.

On November 20, 2009, the Kentucky Court of Appeals upheld the jury's verdict but reduced Summers's punitive damages award to $400,000. McDonald's then appealed to the Kentucky Supreme Court. While its petition was pending in 2010, Ogborn settled with McDonald's for $1.1 million and abandoned her claim for punitive damages. After the court decisions, McDonald's revised its manager-training program to emphasize awareness of scam phone calls and protection of employees' rights.

== Fictional portrayals and documentaries ==
The Mount Washington McDonald's scam has been the basis of the following:

- Episode 17 of season 9 of the television show Law & Order: Special Victims Unit (first aired April 29, 2008) featured Robin Williams as the caller. The character played by Williams identified himself as Detective Milgram, a reference to the Milgram experiment, which studied unreasonable obedience to authority.
- The 2012 feature film Compliance, directed by Craig Zobel.
- The 2016 play Mai Dang Lao, written by David Jacobi, which opened at the Victory Gardens Theatre in Chicago.
- Let's Go To Court Podcast featured the scam in an episode in March 2019, episode titled "Episode 58: The Sleepwalker & the McDonald's Strip Search."
- Casefile True Crime Podcast featured the scam in an episode in September 2020, episode titled "Case 157: The Strip Search Scam".
- My Favorite Murder featured the scam in an episode in August 2022, episode titled "341: If You Were Godzilla...".
- Don't Pick Up The Phone, a 2022 Netflix docuseries
- "Marching To Your Own Drummer", an episode of the podcast Hidden Brain (first published February 24, 2025), which shares the story of the Mount Washington McDonald's scam and discusses the psychological factors, such as authority and conformity, that contributed to the events.

== See also ==
- Milgram experiment (1961)
- Hofling hospital experiment (1966)
- Stanford prison experiment (1971)
- Pranknet (2009)
- Suicide of Jacintha Saldanha (2012)

== Bibliography ==
- Cialdini, R. Influence: Science and Practice, Allyn & Bacon, 2000
- Milgram, S. Obedience to Authority, Harper & Row, 1974
