= Bastone =

Bastone is a surname. Notable people with the surname include:

- William Bastone (born 1961), American journalist
