= Authority bias =

Cognitive bias

Authority bias is the tendency to attribute greater accuracy to the opinion of an authority figure (unrelated to its content) and be more influenced by that opinion. An individual is more influenced by the opinion of this authority figure, believing their views to be more credible, and hence place greater emphasis on the authority figure's viewpoint and are more likely to obey them. This concept is considered one of the social cognitive biases or collective cognitive biases.

Humans generally have a deep-seated duty to authority and tend to comply when requested by an authority figure. Some scholars explain that individuals are motivated to view authority as deserving of their position and this legitimacy leads people to accept and obey the decisions that it makes. System justification theory articulates this phenomenon, particularly within its position that there is a psychological motivation for believing in the steadiness, stability and justness of the current social system.

Authority bias can be measured concerning respect for authority, where higher respect for authority positively correlates with the increased likelihood of exhibiting authority bias.

== Definition ==
Authority bias, a term popularised by American psychologist Stanley Milgram, is defined as having an unreasonably high confidence in the belief that the information verified by a person with formal authority is correct, and therefore an individual is likely to be more influenced by them. Individuals in positions of authority are seen to be treated more favourably, where people believe their views with increased certainty, though the role of authority alone is not always significant enough to directly affect decision-making without this phenomenon being used in conjunction with other heuristics and biases.

The antonym of authority bias is blanket opposition to authority, disregarding their knowledge and believing authority figures to have inherently false claims. This relates to the view of anti-authoritarianism.

Authority bias has many explanations, rooted in the human need to obey authority figures. Namely, authority bias can be explained through evolutionary and social means.

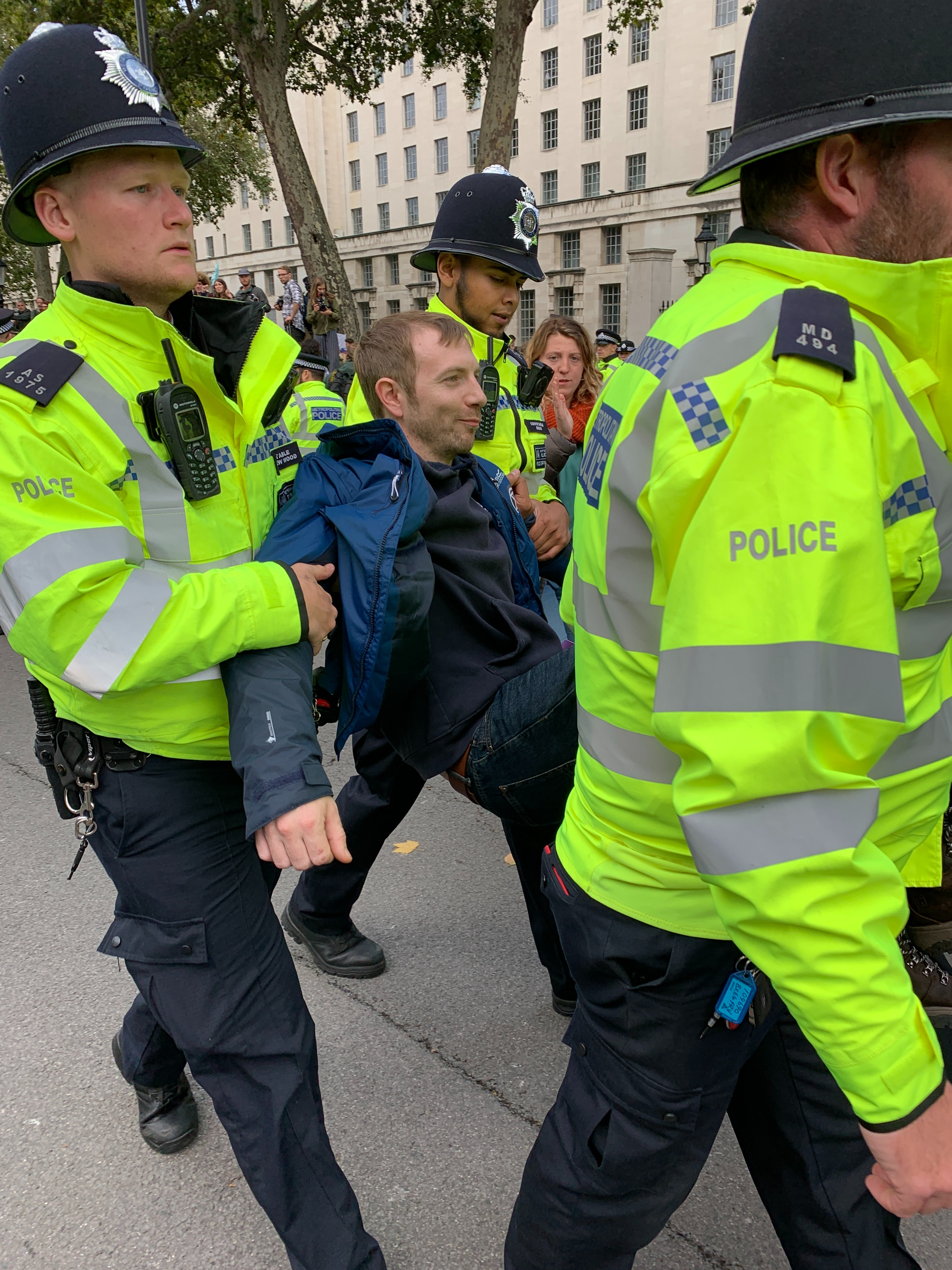
The majority of people accept the police as a legitimate authority, with their position in the social hierarchy giving them the right to apprehend those violating the law, such as this Extinction Rebellion protester.

== Legitimacy of authority ==
Authority bias is greater when the authority figure in question is seen to be legitimate, that is, when they are accepted to be in an authorized position of relative power and have the right to demand obedience. Research has highlighted certain important characteristics that can mark one as a legitimate authority figure, strengthening authority bias, with individuals more likely to be influenced by and obey such figures. These markers can affect whether people regard an individual as an authority figure.

=== Relative position in the social hierarchy ===
All societies are structured in a hierarchical manner, and often those who possess a higher social status are situated further up the hierarchy. The majority of people accept that, in order to maintain a co-operative, functioning society and avoid social chaos, a certain degree of individual choice must be relinquished to authority figures, often representing government institutions, whose role means they have greater status in the social hierarchy. For example, most people accept that, in the criminal justice system, the police have the right to exercise power over others and apprehend wrongdoers, as their role indicates their position in the social hierarchy and their authority. This is often instilled in children from a young age, with parents instructing them to defer to authority figures such as teachers and policemen and accept the opinions of authority figures as correct. There is also a tendency to attribute greater accuracy to and respect the opinions of experts such as doctors. For example, most people have complete confidence in their doctor treating them, as a trusted authority figure with a high social status. This normative behavior can be a useful shortcut, but blind acceptance of expert advice can raise issues if it becomes an automatic response. This was demonstrated by a study conducted by the psychiatrist Charles Hofling, who found that 21 out of 22 nurses would have given patients a potentially fatal dose of a drug when asked to by a doctor despite this instruction contravening official guidance forbidding the administration of the drug. Similar studies in other areas of society have demonstrated the problems that can arise as a result of unquestioningly accepting the opinions of those regarded as having higher status in the social hierarchy.

=== Uniform ===
Outward appearance can signify an individual's social status and relative position in the social hierarchy, and consequently whether they are perceived as a legitimate authority figure. When examining authority bias, outward appearance, manifested in clothing, e.g., in a particular uniform, seems to have a profound effect on whether an individual is respected and obeyed as an authority figure. Research conducted by Bickman and colleagues found that passers-by were twice as likely to obey a confederate dressed as a security guard rather than a milkman when asked by the individual to complete tasks such as picking up litter or lending the confederate a coin for the parking meter. The effects of uniform on authority bias has been a fairly consistent and reliable finding, as other studies, such as those run by Milgram, have reached similar conclusions. In a variation of his original experiment, Milgram found that obedience levels dropped from 65% to 20% when the instructions to enable shocks were given by an ordinary member of the public wearing plain clothes rather than a researcher (signified by a white lab coat). In the real world, attention bias may also play a role, with people selectively paying more attention to the uniform as an important symbol of power, attributing greater accuracy to the opinions of the wearer and displaying more obedience to that figure in response. However, it is important to recognize that factors like uniform are situational and easily changed. Thus, an individual may masquerade as an authority figure and can elicit the authority bias response from others, even though their authority may not be truly legitimate. Though situational factors may point to an authority figure, the effects of authority bias may be stronger when such situational factors are combined with innate factors, such as gender.

=== Gender ===
Evidence also suggests that gender can be important in signifying an authority figure. A subset of authority bias, namely gender-authority bias, explains how, in particular, women may be more susceptible to authority bias than males. In addition to women being more influenced by authority figures than males, female authority figures may be less influential than their male counterparts. Research has shown that both men and women associated men with high authority roles and women with low authority roles, showing how gender can signify an authority figure and subsequently influence authority bias. As a result, confirmation bias may also play a role here in what people interpret to be a characteristic of an authority figure; as many associate higher-authority roles with males, confirmation bias suggests that people will tend to look for, favor, interpret or recall information that fits with this belief, perpetuating this bias, reinforcing the idea of males being more legitimate as authority figures. Gender-authority bias has been demonstrated across a variety of real-world sectors. In politics, research into leadership using the Implicit Association Test (IAT) found that female political leaders tend to face greater resistance to their authority in comparison to their male counterparts. Authority bias is therefore strengthened when an authority figure is male instead of female in politics. In finance, males are often favored as authority figures, being perceived to have greater control of resources, and able to make better decisions, demonstrated by the fact that they hold higher positions and on average earn 66% more than females in the finance industry. Research also suggests that women are more susceptible to authority bias, as they are more influenced than men by hearing fake news from an authority figure.

== Discovery ==
Prior to psychological research, the most common example of this phenomenon was when people obeyed Hitler during World War II, though such effects have been evident throughout history. This relates to pluralistic ignorance, in which authority figures are obeyed regardless of immorality.

The term “authority bias” was first mentioned in literature in reference to state authority bias, in which it simply indicated a preference for being pro-state or anti-state in the US federal election.

Nevertheless, the first-time authority bias was referenced in literature as a cognitive bias was a result of Milgram's experiment, in which it was used to explain obedience to authority figures. Whilst Milgram did not directly use the term "authority bias" in his 1963 paper, the obedience effect identified from his study became the primary example of authority bias. Milgram's findings succeeded the reason why people during World War II obeyed Hitler; participants voluntarily submitted to the authority figure (the experimenter wearing a white lab coat, signifying professionalism). Authority bias is further strengthened through the use of uniforms to signify authority, initially investigated in Milgram's situational variable (where obedience decreased when the uniform of the experimenter was changed from a lab coat to everyday clothes), but further replicated through Bickman's infamous research into obedience, where security guards are more likely to be obeyed without question and thus contributing directly to authority bias.

== Real-world effects ==
=== Advertising ===
Authority bias is used as a marketing strategy in order to increase the legitimacy of claims made about a product. A common example in advertising is where toothpaste companies such as Sensodyne promote the validity of their claims by ensuring the dentists wear lab coats, resulting in the consumer being more trustworthy of the product and consequently more likely to buy the product. Personalized advertising in relation to political voting attitudes can also rely on authority bias.

=== Medicine ===
The expert halo effect is synonymous with authority bias in medicine, where the expert is seen as infallible. Issues arise in pharmaceutical settings, in which non-experts blindly follow expert's commands, resulting in the distribution of harmful drugs and inappropriate healthcare practices.

A further issue concerning the extent to which an authority figure is perceived to be providing accurate information is apparent in cases such as that of Willie Jackson. Forensic dentistry falsely proved Jackson to be guilty, yet the authority bias strengthened the doctor's standpoint in a court of law as they had expert authority bias. Consequently, the negative effect of authority bias has led to wrongful convictions.

=== Business ===
Authority bias is demonstrated in the case of the highest-paid persons' opinion (HIPPO) impact, which describes how employees and other stakeholders in the solution environment tend to go with the opinions and impressions of the highly paid people in an organization.

== Explanations ==
=== Evolution ===
Evolution has established a dominance hierarchy in which it is an evolutionary advantage to obey authority figures, as figures of authority have a greater allocation of resources and other means of survival. The logical fallacy of ad verecundiam is evolutionary, highlighting that experts are more reliable due to a lack of opposing information, increasing trustworthiness.

=== Societal benefits ===
In any society, a diverse and widely accepted system of authority allows the development of sophisticated structures for the production of resources, trade, expansion and social control. Notions of obedience and loyalty to the legitimate rule of others are generally accorded values in schools, the law, the military and in political systems. The strength of the bias to obey a legitimate authority figure comes from systemic socialization practices designed to instill the perception that such obedience constitutes correct behavior, and that genuine authority figures usually possess higher degrees of knowledge, wisdom and power. Different societies vary the terms of this dimension. As a result, authority bias can be rooted in the underlying social norms of society. Consequently, deference to authority can occur mindlessly as a kind of decision-making short cut.

== The role of other heuristics and biases ==
Research support for the strength of authority bias is evident; however, the effect is not significant in some instances. Research is merely correlational, and hence other behavioural effects experienced in conjunction with authority bias strengthen its effects.

=== Confirmation bias ===
An individual exhibiting authority bias may also be subject to experiencing confirmation bias, which is the tendency to search for information that confirms one's own existing beliefs. Research suggests that greater authority is given to financial advisors who confirm one's existing opinions, implying that authority bias is strengthened when it coincides with confirmation bias.

=== Bandwagon effect ===
The bandwagon effect is where people adopt the ideologies of those surrounding them. Society favours the opinions of authority figures, hence it is a majority view which others support.

== See also ==
- Appeal to authority
- Asch conformity experiments
- Gaslighting
- Halo effect
- Misplaced loyalty
- Sheeple
- Speaking truth to power
- Systemic bias
