= Attentional retraining =

Retraining of automatic attentional processes

Attentional retraining is the retraining of automatic attentional processes. The method of retraining varies but has typically employed computerized training programs. The term originally indicated retraining of attention to rehabilitate individuals after a brain injury who had neurological disorders of attention including hemineglect, perseveration, limited attention span, and even ADHD. However, in more recent research and clinical applications attentional retraining has also been applied as a type of cognitive bias modification. In this application, attentional retraining refers to the retraining of automatic attentional biases that have been observed in high levels of anxiety.

== Neuropsychological rehabilitation applications ==
Computerized approaches to cognitive rehabilitation rose out of the recreational use of video games in the 1970s and the rise of the personal computer in the 1980s. The increased availability of personal computers and accessible programming languages allowed for researchers and clinicians to begin experimenting with computerized cognitive training. Most tasks consisted of simple and repetitive training tasks that would increase in difficulty over time. In one such task participants must sit and observe on screen randomly presented numbers and push a buzzer when they see a specific digit – say, 3. Similar tasks were developed and administered to individuals demonstrating neuropsychological impairment in areas of attentional processing. The theorized mechanism of action in this approach to cognitive retraining rests on the ability of the generally trained task (recognizing and responding to numbers presented on screen) to generalize to attentional processes employed in everyday life.

=== Effectiveness in brain injury ===
In a 2001 meta-analysis of outcomes in attention rehabilitation after brain injury, the authors surveyed 30 studies with 359 patients. In this most recent meta-analysis of outcomes the authors found that there were significant and large effect sizes (d statistic) from pre-training to post-training. However, this large effect size was only found for studies without a control group. When the authors analyzed those pre/post studies with a control group the authors found much smaller effect sizes. This finding may reflect the natural improvement seen over time after brain injury.

== Cognitive bias modification applications ==
Attention training for anxiety is a form of applied cognitive processing therapy (ACPT) and is also referred to in the scientific literature as cognitive bias modification therapy for attention. CBM therapies (CBMT) also include applied cognitive processing therapies for attention bias, interpretation bias and imagery.

=== Attention bias ===
The attentional bias is the tendency of certain salient cues in a person's environment to preferentially draw and/or hold the person's attention. For example, individuals with anxiety disorders demonstrate an automatic attentional bias towards threatening cues in their environment and drug users and addicts demonstrate an automatic attentional bias towards drug related cues in their environment.

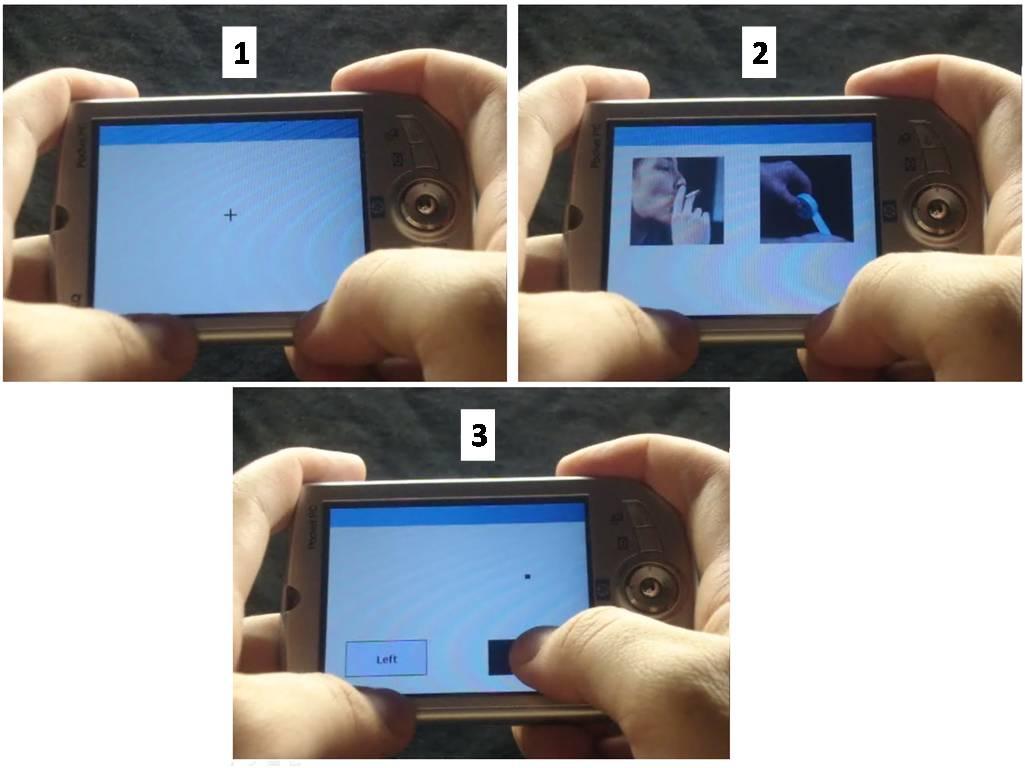
Although there is not yet clinical evidence that CBM works on handheld devices, this image illustrates what a CBM task might look like: Diagram of sequence of events in a single VP trial. 1) The fixation cross is presented for 500ms, 2) the two pictures – one smoking and one neutral- are displayed, and 3) the probe to which the participant must respond is presented.

The rise of research in cognitive bias modification has led to the recent publication of a special issue of the Journal of Abnormal Psychology focusing on the methods and technologies used for cognitive bias modification in psychopathology. Attentional retraining as cognitive bias modification is predicated on the observed attentional bias evident in psychopathology. The most common task used to retrain attention in anxiety is the dot-probe task developed originally by Macleod et al. (1986). In this task two stimuli are briefly presented on screen. One of the stimuli is emotionally salient (a drug cue or threat cue) and the other is neutral. Stimuli (usually words or images) are presented for about 500 milliseconds and then one of the stimuli is replaced by a probe to which the participant must respond. Required responses are usually to indicate what side of the screen the probe is on or to indicate which direction the probe (an arrow in this case) is pointing. The attentional bias is indicated by the difference in reaction time to the probe after it replaces a salient cue versus the reaction time to respond to a cue that replaces the neutral cue. Usually, the anxious participant will be faster in responding to probes replacing salient stimuli than those replacing neutral stimuli. This suggests their attention was drawn preferentially by the previously presented salient stimuli.

Attentional retraining attempts to retrain this automatic attentional process by using the dot-probe task and having the probe replace the neutral stimuli 100% of the time. Thus, the participant learns an implicit if-then rule: if both salient and neutral stimuli are present, then attend preferentially to the neutral stimuli. Therefore, if attentional biases have a causal role on the maintenance of anxiety or drug addictions then lowering the attentional biases should therefore lower feelings of anxiety amongst the anxious and craving amongst the drug addicted and promote abstinence amongst them as well.

=== Effectiveness of CBMT for anxiety ===
Effectiveness of attentional retraining has varied in both the anxiety and addictions literature.

In anxiety, cognitive bias modification therapy results have been much more promising and clear with several studies showing reductions in anxiety amongst the experimental group compared to control. Studies have thus far shown a greater effect of CBMT on anxiety when trials are conducted in a clinic than when conducted at home. According to a recent meta-analysis focusing on the clinical impact of Attention bias Modification (ABM) for alleviating Social Anxiety Disorder (SAD), ABM produces a small but significant reduction in SAD symptoms (g = 0.27), reactivity to speech challenge (g = 0.46), and attentional bias for threat (g = 0.30). These effects were moderated by characteristics of the ABM procedure, the design of the study, and trait anxiety at baseline. However, effects on secondary symptoms (g = 0.09) and SAD symptoms at 4-month follow-up (g = 0.09) were not significant. Although there was no indication of significant publication bias, the authors identified that quality of the studies was substandard and wedged the effect sizes. From a clinical point of view, these findings imply that ABM is not yet ready for wide-scale dissemination as a treatment for SAD in routine care.

It has been found that attention training works through an improvement in the ability to disengage attention from threatening cues. Moreover, it has also been evidenced that attention bias modification is related to changes in activation of the prefrontal cortex to emotional stimuli. Accordingly, a recent study demonstrated that attentional bias for threat among individuals with anxiety disorders may be reduced via the application of neuromodulation techniques, such as transcranial direct-current stimulation over the dorsolateral part of the left prefrontal cortex.

=== Cognitive bias modification in addiction ===
Two large scale recent studies have shown that CBM training with an approach/avoid task in alcohol dependent individuals can reduce relapse rates at one year up to 10%.

In an earlier study of attentional retraining in alcohol drinking attentional retraining altered attentional biases and altered the amount of alcohol subsequently consumed after training compared to a control group.
