= Dot-probe paradigm =

Cognitive psychology test

The dot-probe paradigm is a test used by cognitive psychologists to assess selective attention. It involves presenting participants with emotionally neutral and threatening words simultaneously in each ear, and measuring reaction times.

== Historical development ==
The dot-probe paradigm originated from research conducted in 1981 by Christos Halkiopoulos, then an undergraduate student in psychology at the University College London (UCL). Under the supervision of Professor N.F. Dixon, Halkiopoulos developed what he termed an attentional probe paradigm using auditory stimuli in a dichotic listening task to investigate attentional biases toward threatening information. Participants were presented with emotionally neutral and threatening words simultaneously to each ear, and their attention allocation was assessed by measuring reaction times to auditory probes that followed the stimuli in attended or unattended channels.

This method, implemented using reaction-time probes in the auditory modality, provided early empirical evidence of attentional biases to threat. Halkiopoulos described this work in his 1981 undergraduate dissertation, which is now publicly available.

In 1986, MacLeod, Mathews, and Tata published the first widely known use of the dot-probe paradigm in the visual modality, which has since become the standard form. However, this visual version was directly inspired by Halkiopoulos's earlier work. According to Andrew Mathews, co-author of the 1986 paper:

"Then Michael Eysenck made contact, and we picked the idea for the dot probe method from his student, Christos Halkiopoulos. I certainly remember that being a really fun time."

—Mathews, quoted in Borkovec (2004, p.13).

Additional acknowledgment of Halkiopoulos's role appears in the work of Eysenck, MacLeod, and Mathews, as well as in Eysenck's later publications.

Despite these early recognitions, Halkiopoulos's contribution has often been omitted in subsequent literature. In recent years, efforts have been made to correct the record. A correction notice issued by Michael Eysenck on Taylor & Francis's bookseller site for Cognition and Emotion (2014) states:

"In chapter 4, on pages 70–71, Christos Halkiopoulos should have been credited for his role as the inventor of the Dot Probe Paradigm and for the design and execution of the experiment discussed in Eysenck, M. W. (1991a)."

A full autobiographical account of the development and reception of the paradigm—along with institutional and personal commentary—has been published by Halkiopoulos in a recent preprint. A detailed historical reconstruction of the paradigm's documented origins and subsequent attribution dispute has recently been published by Halkiopoulos.

== Procedure and method ==
During the dot-probe task, participants are situated in front of a computer screen and asked to stare at a fixation cross on the center of the screen. Two stimuli, one of which is neutral and one of which is threatening, appear randomly on either side of the screen. The stimuli are presented for a predetermined length of time (most commonly 500ms), before a dot is presented in the location of one former stimulus. Participants are instructed to indicate the location of this dot as quickly as possible, either via keyboard or response box. Latency is measured automatically by the computer. The fixation cross appears again for several seconds and then the cycle is repeated. Quicker reaction time to the dot when it occurs in the previous location of a threatening stimulus is interpreted as vigilance to threat.

== Clinical uses ==
Researchers have recently begun using a modified version of the dot-probe task to retrain the attentional bias. In this version, the probe replaces the neutral stimuli 100% of the time or the salient stimuli 100% of the time. Over the course of a number of trials the attentional bias for salient stimuli can be reduced (in the case of the 'replace-neutral' condition) or enhanced (in the case of the 'replace-salient' condition). This method of retraining the attentional bias is called attentional retraining.

== Criticism ==
The validity of the dot-probe paradigm has recently been called into question.

== Some studies that use a dot-probe task ==
- Halkiopoulos, C. (1981). Towards a psychodynamic cognitive psychology. Unpublished BSc dissertation manuscript, University College London, London, UK. PDF
- MacLeod, C., Mathews, A. M., & Tata, P. (1986). Attentional bias in emotional disorders. Journal of Abnormal Psychology, 95, 15-20.
- Amin, Z., Constable, R.T., Canli, T. (2004). Attentional bias for valenced stimuli as a function of personality in the dot-probe task. Journal of Research in Personality, 38, 15-23.
- Bradley, B.P. (1998). Attentional Bias for Threatening Facial Expressions in Anxiety: Manipulation of Stimulus Duration.
- Mogg, K, & Bradley, B.P. (1999) Orienting of attention to threatening facial expressions presented under conditions of restricted awareness. Cognition and Emotion, 13, 713-740.
- Mather, M., & Carstensen, L. L. (2003). Aging and attentional biases for emotional faces. Psychological Science, 14, 409-415. PDF
- Schoth, D. E., & Liossi, C. (2010). "Attentional bias towards pictorial representations of pain in individuals with chronic headache". The Clinical Journal of Pain. 26 (3): 244–250. doi:10.1097/AJP.0b013e3181bed0f9. PMID 20173439. S2CID 205454744.
- Mathews, A., & MacLeod, C. (2002). "Induced processing biases have causal effects on anxiety". Cognition & Emotion. 16 (3): 331–354. doi:10.1080/02699930143000518. S2CID 11682439.
- Eysenck, M., MacLeod, C. & Mathews, A. (1987). "Cognitive functioning and anxiety". Psychological Research. 39 (2–3): 189–195. doi:10.1007/bf00308686. PMID 3313488. S2CID 41582695.
