= Pranknet =

Criminal internet organisation based in Canada

- Pranknet logo
- Founded: 2000
- Founding location: Ontario, Canada
- Years active: 2000–2011
- Membership: 100+
- Activities: Telephone harassment and hoaxing, via social engineering; DDoS attacks

Pranknet, also known as Prank University, was an anonymous prank calling virtual community that was involved in a string of malicious pranks and instances of telephone harassment, especially during 2009–2011. Their pranks were coordinated through an online chat room, and convinced others to cause damage to hotels and fast food restaurants of more than $60,000. The group was founded by a man who later referred to himself as "Dex1x1", later identified as a Canadian named Tariq Malik. The group has been linked to nearly 60 separate incidents.

Posing as authority figures, such as fire alarm company representatives and hotel front-desk/corporate managers, Pranknet participants called unsuspecting employees and customers in the United States and tricked them into damaging property, pulling fire alarms, setting off fire sprinklers, breaking out windows, and humiliating acts such as disrobing and the consumption of human urine. Pranknet members could listen in real-time and discuss the progress together in a private chat room.

In 2009, a wave of the pranks across the United States prompted internal alerts by Choice Hotels, as well as advisories by the Sheriff's office of Orange County, Florida, and others. At that time, law enforcement officials from a number of jurisdictions and the Federal Bureau of Investigation began investigating the various incidents as well as the identity of "Dex".

== Technology ==
Pranknet initially operated through a chat room at Pranknet.org, and participants used Skype to make their calls. As of 2009, Skype used encryption and obfuscation of its communication services and provided an uncontrolled registration system for users without proof of identity, making it difficult to trace and identify users. After Skype began an internal investigation, Pranknet left Skype and briefly used Paltalk for its chats and calls. However, Paltalk banned Pranknet after a February 2009 KFC incident. After Pranknet users were banned from Paltalk, the company was subjected to multiple DDoS attacks. Beginning in 2009, members chatted before, during, and after each prank via the chat system of Beyluxe Messenger, which is owned and operated in Romania, and thus outside of North America. Audiences ranged from 40 to 200 people at any given time.

Pranks that created sufficient havoc were posted on YouTube. Updates were also provided through a Twitter account.

== Notable Pranknet incidents ==
In February 2009, "Dex" and a member called "PRANKSTER" called a KFC restaurant in Manchester, New Hampshire. Posing as a manager from the corporate office, he persuaded employees to douse the building with fire suppression chemicals and to then proceed outside, remove all of their clothing and urinate on each other. He claimed the chemicals were caustic and this would render them inert, similarly to a jellyfish sting. When "Dex" posted the audio to YouTube he described it as "Epic KFC Prank Call (greatest ever)...dex successfully convinces the 3 female employees to undress fully nude outside and urinate on each other." Many months later "Dex", posing this time as an insurance adjuster, called the same KFC and had the victims describe their experiences while Pranknet members listened.

On February 10, "Dex" and a member called "DTA_Mike", posing as hotel front desk employees, called two separate guests at the Best Western hotel in Shillington, Pennsylvania. Using the pretense of a ruptured gas line, the caller persuaded each guest to break a window and then throw the television out. "Dex" and his friend repeated the same stunt on February 19 with a Best Western in Santee, California.

On April 30, a Pranknet member called "Rollin in the A" called Prejean's Restaurant in Lafayette, Louisiana posing as an official from the health department. This target was selected because the restaurant provided live video streaming of its dining area on their own website. The victim at this restaurant was told that Prejean's pork was tainted with the swine flu. "Rollin in the A" also told the manager to close the restaurant immediately and tell the customers (75 of them) that they may have eaten tainted food.

On May 27, "Dex" called a Hampton Inn in York, Nebraska, and tricked an employee into setting off the fire alarm. As guests made their way to the lobby, a second call was placed to the front desk. "Dex" claimed that, to avoid alleged fines, the fire department should not be called. Instead, the caller gave various bogus instructions to turn the alarm off, including going to a website that only displayed pornography. The next suggestion from the caller was to break the front windows of the hotel. A truck driver staying at the hotel volunteered, and under direction from "Dex", the man drove his semi-trailer truck into the front door. Later that night, "Dex" tweeted: "I just pulled off the most epic prank. I had a hotel guest back his truck into the hotel front window (in the lobby), and break the window." The post was deleted in late July.

On June 6, 2009, a prank was made on a Holiday Inn Express hotel in Conway, Arkansas. The caller posed as a representative from the company that installed the hotel's fire sprinkler and claimed the system needed to be reset by pulling the fire alarm. Once the alarm was turned on, the clerk was told that the sprinklers would activate unless windows were broken. The same day, the pranksters called a Comfort Suites in Gadsden, Alabama, persuading a clerk to pull a fire alarm; sprinklers were subsequently activated, causing water damage.

In July, a Pranknet member called a Hilton in Orlando, Florida, and, claiming there was a gas leak, convinced a family staying there to break windows with the lid for the toilet tank, destroy a mirror, bash in a wall using a lamp, and throw their mattress out the window. The incident cost $5,000 in damages.

Also in July, a Pranknet caller informed two hotel guests that deadly spiders were about to infest their room. The caller was able to manipulate the couple into breaking their window with the tank lid from their toilet.

On July 5, Pranknet members Powell and Markle called an Arby's in Baytown, Texas (where Powell lives) and talked a worker there into triggering the fire suppression system, causing an estimated $4,600 in damages. Powell failed in his attempts to get any windows broken. Powell was later arrested and charged with criminal mischief for the incident.

On July 20, Markle tricked a desk clerk at the Homewood Suites in Lexington, Kentucky, into drinking another person's urine. The prank started with a call to a guest. The guest was told it was the front desk calling and that a prior guest had tested positive for Hepatitis C. The guest was then told there was a doctor on site and a simple urine test could determine if the guest was infected. The urine was to be brought to the front desk in a simple drinking glass, referred to by the code name of "apple cider" in order to not rouse suspicion amongst guests. Switching roles, Markle then called the front desk alleging to be an employee of Martinelli's Cider. He told the clerk that a representative from the company would like to come downstairs with a sample of their new drink. The guest from the previous call then arrived and handed the clerk his urine. Markle then coaxed the woman to try it. He asked how it tasted. "Horrible", she said. "That does not taste like cider. I'm not going to take another sip, that's horrible." Markle replied: "Well, I need to inform you of something, ma'am. I want you to understand that you just drank that man's urine." In its investigation, the cyber crimes division of the police department of Lufkin, Texas, requested a subpoena for Markle's Skype activities. The police report classifies the Lexington incident as first-degree wanton endangerment, a Class D felony in Kentucky. Markle was subsequently sentenced to a shock incarceration term of six months.

Additionally, an employee at a Holiday Inn Express was persuaded by a Pranknet caller to set off a fire alarm, break windows, and set off sprinklers which flooded the building. Damages were estimated at $50,000.

The Smoking Gun reported that Pranknet leader "Dex" was responsible for an October 21 hoax in which he phoned ESPN reporter Elizabeth Moreau, tricking her into breaking windows in her room at the Hilton Garden Inn in Gainesville, Florida. He then initiated a conference call with a front desk employee at the hotel, where he then claimed he was Moreau's boyfriend and that the damage was a result of them fighting, as well as making a number of vulgar statements. As a result of the hoax, a Gainesville Police detective was assigned to the case.

In November 2010, an elderly man staying at a Motel 6 in Spartanburg, South Carolina, was tricked by a Pranknet member posing as a hotel administrator into destroying his television set and smashing mirrors in his room with a wrench to destroy hidden cameras supposedly left by a previous guest. The man, told that there was a "midget" trapped in an adjoining room, was then tricked into destroying a sheetrock wall behind his room door, almost making his way through to the next room. As one of the prankster's returned calls was heard by police and other guests who received prank calls soon called the front desk, the hotel did not hold the man accountable for the damages, but did ask him to leave. The pranksters called back on March 11, 2011, persuading a guest to "disable" a sprinkler head by smashing it with a toilet lid to prevent a 'toxic gas' from entering the room. According to TSG, "Motel 6 is a preferred target because Pranknet members can call directly into rooms without having to know a guest's name" As of November 1, 2011, this is no longer possible. After police arrived to answer a 911 call placed by the motel manager, they declined to press charges against the victim but noted that other similar phone calls had been received at the motel.

On December 5, 2010, two Pranknet members identified by The Smoking Gun collaborated to humiliate a 22 year old Iraq War veteran at a Motel 6 in Amarillo, Texas. One, posing as the hotel receptionist, informed him that the prior occupant of his room had been diagnosed with "H1N1 flu virus", and transferred him to the other, posing as a physician, who over the course of half an hour directed him to induce vomiting, then to consume some of his own urine to "kill the incubation period", and finally to collect a stool sample in a pillowcase, which he was to bring to the front desk. A prankster then called the hotel's actual front desk, identifying himself by the guest's full name and claiming to be so angry with the service that he would leave a pillowcase full of fecal matter at the front desk. The receptionist locked the door and called police, so the veteran returned to his room, where his conversation with police officers the receptionist had summoned became audible to the pranksters' followers. They finished by calling other visitors at the hotel describing aspects of the prank until the police were called again half an hour later. With voice electronically altered and posing as the mother of a boy making prank calls, one of the pranksters managed to convince police to put the victim back on the phone, who unwittingly recounted his experience to the pranksters.

On January 9, 2011, a Holiday Inn in Omaha, Nebraska, was targeted. Taking advantage of the ability to call guests of the hotel directly, the prankster pretended to be a Fire Department employee reading instructions from a computer checklist to prevent an explosion from a gas leak. These instructions included to "break the red glass vial in the sprinkler", leading to $115,000 in water damage in seven guest rooms and a conference room. The guest was also persuaded to rip a mirror from his wall to find the (non-existent) shutoff valve.

=== Phone and computer hijacking ===
Beginning in July 2009, "Dex" began hijacking phone numbers of U.S. businesses and had them forwarded to his Skype account. Pretending to be an authority from a particular business, he would first call a phone company and claim they have no dial tone, then request that all calls be forwarded to the number he provided.

On July 7, "Dex" took over incoming calls of the Olympic Game Farm in Port Angeles, Washington, making obscene sexual comments to customers who called. On July 11, he repeated the stunt with the Fun 4 All amusement park in Chula Vista, California. On July 13, he took over incoming calls to a Best Western in Jacksonville, Florida for over 12 hours. In one interaction, a woman called to find out if her husband had arrived and was told first that he had been in an accident, and then that he was having sex with a man in his room and did not wish to be disturbed. On July 15, "Dex" controlled incoming calls to a Hilton Garden Inn in Tulsa, Oklahoma. He told people inquiring about a shuttle to take a cab and they'd be reimbursed. He told some callers the hotel had a swine flu outbreak and told other callers the hotel was in the midst of a hostage situation.

Talking hotel front desk clerks through a series of steps using TeamViewer, "Dex" posed as a corporate headquarters IT supervisor and took remote control of hotel computers.

=== Craigslist abuse ===
Pranknet members frequently placed Craigslist ads offering free tickets or items. Inquirers were bombarded with obscene sexual rants and racial epithets. A 12-year-old girl called about a free trampoline, and "Dex" told her not to get pregnant by a black man because "they have AIDS". Markle frequently called women who were selling household items on the site, and after getting the home addresses of victims, told them he was on his way over to rape them and kill their children.

== Smoking Gun investigation ==
"Dex" and other Pranknet members had regularly taunted victims and others, saying they were untraceable. In an interview with The Smoking Gun on June 17, 2009, "Dex" exhibited no worries about being tracked down or caught. In a July co-interview with Markle, he boasted: "It's too difficult to find me. I'm a ghost on the Internet. I do pretty much everything I can to keep anything out of my computer that would lead it back to my actual computer. I'm not a stupid individual, like I said."

In June 2009, The Smoking Gun launched an investigation that lasted nearly two months and included travel to Windsor, Ontario and a stakeout outside Malik's mother's home. Smoking Gun editor William Bastone emailed "Dex", and during a Skype interview provided URLs on the Smoking Gun website. The URLs were unique; when Malik viewed them, it revealed his IP address and location. The names, biographies and locations of Pranknet's founder "Dex" and a number of prolific members, and their other findings, were published on their website and provided to the FBI in August 2009. A 2016 article by the BBC noted Bastone's outing of Pranknet's members and also referred to Pranknet as "long gone".

== Members ==
According to crime reporting website The Smoking Gun, key members included:

- Tariq Malik, also known as Pranknet leader "Dex" (a tribute to the character Dexter Morgan, a fictional serial killer). In an interview with The Globe and Mail, "Dex" denied he was Malik (but confirmed he is Canadian).
- William Marquis, Pranknet's "second in command". Known as Hempster, Marquis was previously convicted in 2004 for drunk driving and in 2005 for marijuana production. CBC News attempted to interview Marquis regarding the Pranknet allegations. However, he did not answer his door.
- James "Tyler" Markle, one of the group's most prolific callers. Markle was already a person of interest in a Lufkin Police investigation involving a phone call to a local McDonald's, and was arrested for this subsequently. The Smoking Gun had based the claim upon information from old MySpace and Facebook pages, and people from the area who identified Markle in photos. In an interview with The Lufkin Daily News, Markle denied that the person described on TSG was him, claiming instead it was another person called the Samoan Prankster. He was charged with felonies in two separate states: for making a felony terroristic threat in the Lufkin McDonald's case and for terrorizing and criminal damage (both felonies) in a separate incident involving a Wendy's restaurant in Gretna, Louisiana. He was later extradited to Louisiana as a result of the charges filed in the Gretna incident. In December 2010, Markle was sentenced to 5 years imprisonment in Texas for the prank call to the Lufkin McDonald's. Markle was then released on shock probation, some time later he revoked his shock probation and served 1.5 years in State jail on lessened charges.
- Shawn Powell, previously imprisoned for indecency with a minor (for taking nude photos of an 8-year-old female relative), a felony that put him in custody for 13 months. He specialized in racist and threatening calls. He was charged with criminal mischief for his part in a hoax call to the Baytown Arby's restaurant, resulting in the fire suppression system being activated and resulting in $1,350 worth of damage.
- LeeAnn Jordan, who had used her PayPal account to receive international money transfers and to pay for Paltalk.

A former member, Jericho Batsford, left the group in 2009 after the incident in Conway, Arkansas, and contacted local FBI agents. She told them she knew Dex's identity to be that of Malik and that he was responsible for many incidents. In response to her defection, Pranknet members have constantly harassed her home and her workplace via Skype and Beyluxe. Malik told members to be patient, that she would not answer the phone and let them get to her, and to instead "get her later on down the road, when she least expects it." Batsford had participated in some phone pranks, but left when she witnessed members encouraging children to make bomb threats.

Officials in at least four U.S. States and six U.S. cities stated that they were considering charges against "Dex" and his possible extradition from Canada to face trial.
