= Authority (Law & Order: Special Victims Unit) =

- Law & Order: Special Victims Unit episode
- Episode no.: Season 9 Episode 17
- Directed by: David Platt
- Written by: Neal Baer; Amanda Green
- Production code: 09017
- Original air date: April 29, 2008

Guest appearances
- Robin Williams as Merritt Rook; Didi Conn as Nurse; Monica Raymund as Trini Martinez; Ka-Ling Cheung as Dr. Chang; Joe Scarborough as himself; Scott Adsit as Dwight Lomax; Mo Rocca as Merritt's Follower; Matthew Stadelmann as Joel; Ramsey Faragallah as Dr. Sandip; Guy A. Fortt as Uni Fagan; Angelique Cinelu as Marcie

Episode chronology
← Previous "Closet"	Next → "Trade"
- Law & Order: Special Victims Unit season 9

"Authority" is the seventeenth episode of the ninth season of the American police procedural Law & Order: Special Victims Unit, and the 200th overall. "Authority" first aired on April 29, 2008, on NBC in the United States. The episode's plot sees Detectives Elliot Stabler (Christopher Meloni) and Olivia Benson (Mariska Hargitay) investigating a caller who impersonates a police officer and asks people to perform criminal acts. The detectives learn that the caller is audio engineer Merritt Rook (Robin Williams), a man who opposes authority due to a tragic event in his past. After Rook seizes an opportunity to kidnap Benson, he asks Stabler to inflict pain on her or watch him do it.

The episode was co-written by Neal Baer and Amanda Green, while David Platt directed. It was inspired by the 2004 Mount Washington strip search phone call scam, the Milgram experiment, and the New York performance-art group Improv Everywhere's "Frozen Grand Central" event. Williams was cast after his friend Richard Belzer (John Munch) approached the producers and told them that Williams would like to appear on the show. Executive producer Neal Baer stated that they developed the story only after learning that Williams was available. Filming for the episode began in late March on location at Bryant Park, Grand Central Terminal and Long Island City.

"Authority" was seen by 12.06 million viewers, winning the 10 p.m. hour with a 4.1 Nielsen rating in the 18–49 demographic. Critical response was mixed, with some reporters branding the plot implausible, unsatisfying and inane. Others enjoyed the episode, saying that it was intense and chilling. For his portrayal of Rook, Williams won the Favorite Scene Stealing Guest Star accolade at the 35th People's Choice Awards. He also received a nomination for Primetime Emmy Award for Outstanding Guest Actor in a Drama Series, while Karen Stern earned a nomination for Best Edited One-Hour Series for Commercial Television at the 2009 American Cinema Editors Awards.

== Plot ==
Detectives Elliot Stabler and Olivia Benson are called to a fast food restaurant, where teenage employee Trini Martinez is found naked, bound and gagged in the manager's office. The manager Dwight Lomax explains that he received a call from a Det. Milgram, who instructed him to detain Trini and strip-search her for a stolen wallet. Stabler informs a devastated Dwight that there is no Det. Milgram. The detectives learn that the same caller has struck before and identify him as audio engineer Merritt Rook. Rook uses his vocal skills to give himself a false alibi, but is soon found out and charged with conspiracy to commit sexual assault.

Rook chooses to represent himself at trial, where he encourages the jury to question authority. He is found not guilty and subsequently organizes public demonstrations urging people to question and defy authority. Benson and Stabler learn from Rook's colleague that his hatred of authority figures began when his wife died during childbirth, following a mistake made by her doctor. Benson and Stabler discover that the doctor died in a car accident that was ruled a suicide. After finding evidence that Rook harassed the doctor so much that the doctor chose to take his own life, Benson and Stabler go to apprehend Rook. They find him at Grand Central Terminal, but Stabler loses track of Benson and Rook amongst the crowd. Benson's gun and phone are later found in a trash can.

Stabler locates Rook at a recording studio, and Rook shows him Benson, who is bound to a chair in a soundproof room that Rook alleges to have been wired to explosives. Rook shows the switch and tells Stabler that Benson is connected to an electricity generator. He gives Stabler the option of pressing the button himself or watch as he does it. Stabler refuses to hurt Benson and tries to reason with Rook, telling him that too many people have suffered.

Rook thanks Stabler for not being a sheep, confessing to no explosives and no harm done to Benson; her screams were pre-recorded. Benson and Stabler arrest Rook. Before leaving the studio, Benson explains that she left Grand Central with Rook when he claimed to have a bomb. As the three leave the studio, Rook causes an explosion using a detonator tied to his ankle and flees. Benson and Stabler give chase, but when they cannot find him, they assume that Rook jumped into the river handcuffed and drowned.

== Production ==
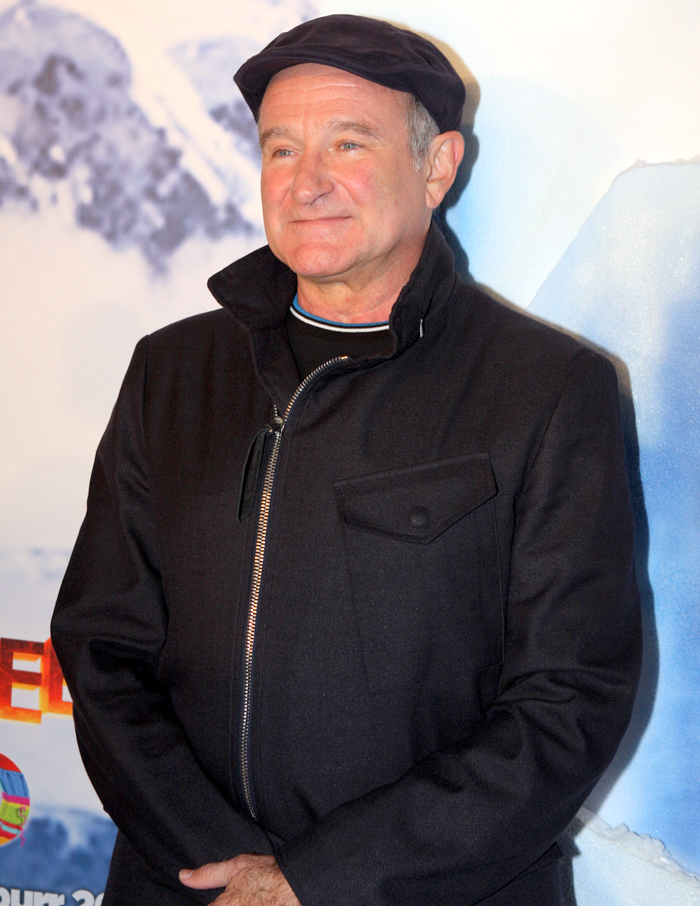
Robin Williams guest-stars as the episode's villain Merritt Rook.

On March 18, 2008, Michael Ausiello reported that actor Robin Williams would be guest-starring in the 200th episode of Law & Order: Special Victims Unit. Series spokeswoman Pam Golum said that Williams would be portraying an "engineer whose life has gone terribly wrong", and who faces the consequences of his actions. Williams was cast after his friend Richard Belzer, who plays Detective John Munch, approached the producers and told them that Williams would like to appear on the show. Williams previously acted alongside Belzer during an appearance in a 1994 episode of Homicide: Life on the Street. Executive producer Neal Baer stated that they developed the story only after learning that Williams was available. He also said that the producers often try to cast actors like Williams who do not usually appear on television, so that they can surprise their audience.

"Authority" was written by Baer and co-executive producer Amanda Green. It was inspired by the 2004 Mount Washington strip search phone call scam, the Milgram experiment, and the New York performance-art group Improv Everywhere's "Frozen Grand Central" event. The episode focuses on Merritt Rook (Williams), who becomes a "folk hero" for rebelling against conformity. Baer said that Rook has issues with authority and explained, "It's a story about what makes people do things if they think that they won't be responsible." Baer believed that the episode was "one of the best cat-and-mouse stories" that they had ever produced. He also said that he could not imagine anyone other than Williams playing the role of Merritt Rook.

Filming for the episode took place in Bryant Park and Grand Central Terminal on March 29, 2008. The cast and crew were also seen shooting a large outdoor pillow fight. In early April, filming took place at Broadway and Vernon Boulevard in Long Island City. A handcuffed Williams was seen running away from Hargitay and Meloni following an explosion in a building.

Actors Scott Adsit, Mo Rocca and Didi Conn also guest star in the episode, while talk show host Joe Scarborough appears as himself.

Law & Order: Special Victims Unit became only the third network prime-time drama to reach 200 episodes, behind the original Law & Order series and ER. Christopher Meloni expressed his joy for reaching 200 episodes of Law & Order: Special Victims Unit, saying that it was "awesome" and "almost surreal". He also enjoyed having Williams on set, calling it "an ultimate acting moment for me". His co-star Mariska Hargitay said that she was proud that Williams wanted to appear on the show, and that she considered it a milestone to be working with him.

== Reception ==
=== Ratings ===
In its original broadcast, "Authority" was seen by 12.06 million viewers. It won the 10 p.m. hour with a 4.1 Nielsen rating in the 18–49 demographic, and an 11% audience share. In its original UK broadcast on Channel 5, the episode was seen by 830,000 viewers. It was the 28th most-watched show on the channel for the week ending November 20, 2011.

=== Critical response ===
"Authority" received a mixed response from critics. The Boston Herald's Mark A. Perigard disliked the episode and gave it a "D" rating. Perigard thought that the first half of the episode was reasonable, but felt that Stabler and Benson became incompetent and ignored police procedure for "an inane plot". Perigard also felt that Williams needed to be restrained by a decent plot and director, but he instead "hurtles off the rails" toward the end.

David Kronke of the Los Angeles Daily News thought that anyone could have played the part of Merritt Rook, and that Williams spent the episode channeling his character from One Hour Photo (2002). Kronke also noted that "some pretty damning evidence seems to be overlooked at Rook's trial", and he believed that Stabler and Benson gave up too easily at the end.

Melissa Gaudron, writing for The Age, was thankful that Williams played Rook with "a little more psychopathic tendency" than his Mork & Mindy character. She branded the plot implausible and joked that the writers should have just romantically paired Stabler and Benson together.

Debi Enker, another reporter for The Age, liked that Williams appeared "in a more controlled mode", saying that he made the episode "mildly interesting". Enker called the conclusion "unsatisfying" and wondered whether it was leading to a future appearance by Rook.

Jane Rackham of the Radio Times enjoyed the moment when Rook defends himself in court, calling it a "cracking scene". She also called the ending an "intense final showdown".

Emily Wright of The Boston Globe believed that after his role in One Hour Photo, Merritt Rook was the creepiest role Williams had ever played.

Entertainment Weekly's Lanford Beard included "Authority" in his "16 Magnificent Milestone Episodes" feature. Beard dubbed the plot "chilling", and said that the episode "cranked up the volume to 11, adds layers of twisted motivation for Rook's action". Beard concluded that Rook had "a literally explosive grand exit".

Following Williams's death in August 2014, Julie Hinds of the Detroit Free Press named Merritt Rook as one of the actor's "five great unsung roles".

=== Accolades ===
For his portrayal of Merritt Rook, Williams received a nomination for Outstanding Guest Actor in a Drama Series at the 60th Primetime Emmy Awards. At the 35th People's Choice Awards, Williams won the Favorite Scene Stealing Guest Star accolade. Editor Karen Stern earned a nomination for Best Edited One-Hour Series for Commercial Television at the 2009 American Cinema Editors Awards.
