= The Smoking Gun =

Website that posts legal documents, arrest records, police mugshots

- Available in: English
- Owners: William Bastone, Andrew Goldberg, and Joseph Jesselli (TSG Industries Inc.)
- Creators: William Bastone, Barbara Glauber, and Daniel Green
- Website: www.thesmokinggun.com
- Commercial: yes
- Registration: none
- Launched: February 13, 1997; 29 years ago
- Current status: active

The Smoking Gun is a website that posts legal documents, arrest records, and police mugshots on a daily basis. The intent is to bring to the public light information that is somewhat obscure or unreported by more mainstream media sources. Most of the site's content revolves around historical and current events, although it also features documents and photos relating to out-of-the-ordinary crimes and people.

== History ==
The website was founded in 1997 by William Bastone; his wife, Barbara Glauber, a graphic designer; and Daniel Green, a freelance journalist formerly of The Village Voice, and the son of Stephen L. Green. Most of The Smoking Gun's content is obtained through Freedom of Information Act requests to federal, state, and local law enforcement agencies, and from public records such as court documents. The site has used those requests to assemble a collection of mugshots of current and historical celebrities.

The cable network truTV, formerly Court TV, purchased The Smoking Gun, as well as the website Crime Library, in 2000. A series of the same name premiered on Court TV in 2005, which featured some of the site's stories and assorted sketch humor, using string puppets. This series was later moved to and shown on Cartoon Network's Adult Swim block following Time Warner's acquisition of Court TV in 2006.

The site published its second book, The Dog Dialed 911: A Book of Lists from The Smoking Gun, in October 2006.

From March 2008 until January 2011, on truTV, The Smoking Gun sponsored a cable television series called The Smoking Gun Presents: World's Dumbest.... The series was originally known as World's Dumbest Criminals, but was re-titled World's Dumbest... and began covering other topics. William was a cast member on the show alongside Smoking Gun writer Andrew Goldberg. They left the show after season 1. As of January 2011, the program was re-titled again to truTV Presents: World's Dumbest....

In June 2014, The Smoking Gun was sold back to William Bastone.

== Investigations ==
The Smoking Gun began to conduct investigations of criminal activity and publicize its results. In August 2009, the site outed members of Pranknet, a virtual community notorious for tricking hotel and fast-food restaurant employees into setting off fire alarms, engaging fire-suppression systems, and engaging in humiliating acts. The group, whose members include two convicted child molesters, also engaged in threatening telephone harassment, placing fake Craigslist ads and shouting racial epithets and obscenities at people responding to them. The group members responded to Craigslist ads placed by young mothers selling household goods, and after gaining the seller's address in an exchange, members would threaten the seller, saying that they would go to their house to rape them and murder their children.

In 2006, the site uncovered widespread fabrication in James Frey's alleged memoir A Million Little Pieces. This investigation led to a public rebuke of Frey by talk show host Oprah Winfrey, who had previously endorsed Frey's book as part of her Oprah's Book Club. Frey's book, describing his alleged years of drug and alcohol abuse and subsequent recovery, contained a number of descriptions of criminal or otherwise outrageous incidents.

In 2010, the site revealed financial irregularities in Yéle Haiti, a charitable foundation set up by rapper Wyclef Jean, soon after he publicized its successful fundraising for disaster relief following the 2010 earthquake in Haiti. As reported by The New York Times, the foundation had failed to file several years of tax returns. Later, it was found to have illegally diverted funds to the personal use of Jean and some of his family. In 2019, Jean admitted irregularities at the charity.
