= Journal of Research in Personality =

- Discipline: Personality psychology
- Language: English
- Edited by: Zlatan Krizan

Publication details
- History: 1988-present
- Publisher: Elsevier
- Frequency: Bimonthly
- Impact factor: 3.068 (2020)

Standard abbreviations
- ISO 4: J. Res. Pers.

Indexing
- ISSN: 0092-6566
- OCLC no.: 1788573

Links
- Journal homepage; Online access

The Journal of Research in Personality is a peer-reviewed academic journal covering the field of personality psychology, published by Elsevier and edited by Zlatan Krizan. It publishes articles including experimental and descriptive research on issues in the field of personality and related fields. These can include genetic, physiological, motivational, learning, perceptual, cognitive, and social processes. Both normal and abnormal psychology, and also studies of animal personality have been published.
