= Martie Haselton =

American psychologist

- Born: Martie Gail Haselton; 1970 (age 54–55)
- Education: University of San Diego; College of William & Mary; University of Texas at Austin
- Known for: Research on human sexual behavior
- Scientific career
- Fields: Evolutionary psychology
- Institutions: University of California, Los Angeles
- Thesis: Biases in social inference: Errors in design or by design? (2000)
- Doctoral advisor: David M. Buss

Martie Gail Haselton (born 1970) is an American psychologist and professor of communication at the University of California, Los Angeles, where she holds positions in the Department of Psychology and the Institute for Society and Genetics. Her research is in the field of evolutionary psychology, particularly as it relates to human sexual behavior and intimate relationships.

== Books ==
- Forgas, Joseph P.; Haselton, Martie G.; von Hippel, William, eds. (2014) [2007]. Evolution and the Social Mind: Evolutionary Psychology and Social Cognition (Reprint ed.). New York: Routledge. ISBN 978-1138006249.
- Haselton, Martie G. (2019) [2018]. Hormonal: The Hidden Intelligence of Hormones – How They Drive Desire, Shape Relationships, Influence Our Choices, and Make Us Wiser (Reprint ed.). New York: Little, Brown Spark. ISBN 978-0316369206.
