= Affinity bias =

Cognitive bias favoring people perceived as similar

Affinity bias, also known as the similarity bias, refers to the tendency for decision-makers to favor those who are similar to themselves and to exclude those who are different. The most common setting for studying this is recruiting interviews, where interviewers tend to give higher scores to candidates who are similar to themselves. It is sometimes called the similar-to-me effect, but some researchers argue that it becomes the bias only when this effect is irrelevant to job requirement. The similarity could be reflected by demographic characteristics such as gender and race, but could also be in the psychological aspects such as attitudes, beliefs, values, and personality traits.

The main framework is the similarity-attraction hypothesis. A systematic review summarized its role in workplace as a double-edged sword. It could be really effective for communication and interaction, but it could also lead to affinity bias. Social psychologist Byrne systematically studied the relationship between similarity and liking, while sociologists use homophily to describe the phenomenon that people having more similarity interact more often. Regarding why people like those who are like them, there are several explanations: (1) similar attitudes make one feel validated and pleasant (reinforcement–affect model); (2) people infer that others have good qualities because they are similar to me (information-processing model); (3) similarity makes people think that the other person is more capable. Rivera’s research on hiring at elite firms found that evaluators often intentionally use their own experiences as a benchmark, placing value on cultural similarities such as extracurricular interests or lifestyles.

Research in this area covered topics such as recruitment, performance evaluations between supervisors and subordinates, team dynamics, the selection of venture capital partners, and racial concordance in doctor-patient communication. In the context of recruitment, some studies have found that interviewers tend to favor candidates of their own race. But in highly structured interviews, the effects of racial or gender similarity are either small or non-significant. Some researchers have also pointed out that, interviewers think liking those who are similar to oneself can offer some advantages, such as more pleasant working relationships and higher employee retention. Greenwald and Pettigrew argued that in contemporary America, favoring one’s own group is plausibly a more important source of discrimination, and it does not require one to be hostile.

Researchers proposed and tested several strategies to mitigate this bias, including structured interviews, establishing evaluation criteria before reviewing candidates, implementing organizational accountability structures for diversity, as well as diversity training and interventions for implicit bias.

== Definition and terminology ==
=== Definition ===
Affinity bias, also known as the similarity bias, refers to the tendency for decision-makers to favor those who are similar to themselves and to exclude those who are different. Research has reported that in recruitment interviews, this kind of bias is usually shown as interviewers giving higher scores to candidates who are similar to themselves in demographic characteristics (e.g., age, race) and attitudes. Sears and Rowe (2003) pointed out that in the traditional "similar-to-me" paradigm, similarity is considered as a source of bias only when it comes from interviewers rely on characteristics that are not related to the job itself. A systematic review used the "double-edged sword" to describe the role of similarity-attraction in the workplace. On the one hand, it is a "fundamental human drive" and really important for effective social interaction in the workplace. On the other hand, it could lead to this bias. Therefore, according to Tsui and O'Reilly's advice, managers should always bear in mind that they might easily have tendency to like subordinates who are demographically similar to them, and they need to ensure that this affinity does not end up biasing their judgment or employment decisions towards these employees.

Lauren Rivera, an American sociologist at the Kellogg School of Management of Northwestern University, conducted 120 interviews with employers in elite professional service firms (e.g., investment banks, law firms, and management consulting firms) to examine how they hire for entry-level professional positions. One banker recalled her best recent interviewee because they both ran the New York marathon and started talking about how they both love stalking celebrities during the interview, describing an "instant connection" between them and commented that she "loved her". In contrast, a director from public service background expressed her unwillingness to interview a candidate because the candidate has most experience in commodity sales and the director personally found nothing to discuss with her.

Is the preference for similar others intentional? There are two different explanations in the literature. Borrowing wisdom from Byrne’s reinforcement model (similar attitudes make people feel they are validated, thus inducing affinity), Montoya and Horton (2013) pointed out that such reinforcement comes up automatically, and sometimes people may even be consciously unaware of it. In contrast, Rivera's field studies indicated that the evaluators she interviewed often used themselves as a reference point for assessing candidates and the process was "commonly active and intentional". When reliable predictors of a person's competence and potential are difficult to obtain, employers may sometimes intentionally use their own personal experiences as "models of merit", inferring that candidates with similar backgrounds as themselves are more likely to achieve success.

=== Terminology ===
Similarity-attraction hypothesis is one of the key theoretical foundations for management and industrial/organizational psychology, stating that similarity could generate attraction and positive affect. Scholars also use similar-to-me effect to refer to this phenomenon.

Sociologists usually use homophily to describe that people who share similarity interact more than people who are not similar. Rosabeth Moss Kanter introduced the theory of homosocial reproduction in her book Men and Women of the Corporation (1977), where white male managers tend to promote people like themselves because of better communication and trust. Rivera suggested that while the concepts homophily and homosocial reproduction have become nearly synonymous with preferences based on gender and race within sociological literature, they also contain the meaning of cultural similarities. She argued that besides what we expect about the professional aspect, hiring is also a process for employers to sort out those who share their own tastes and lifestyles. Sometimes, this kind of cultural matching even gains more weight than the evaluation of productivity.

Finance also used the term of affinity to describe this inclination. A study on venture capital examines whether investors select partners based on shared ethnic, educational, or professional backgrounds, where the authors distinguish between ability- and affinity-based characteristics.

=== Related concepts ===
Intergroup bias refers to the systematic tendency for people to evaluate their own group (or its members) more favorably than other groups (or their members). In-group favoritism is a form of intergroup bias, while affinity bias is about the relationship between two specific people. In their meta-analysis, Montoya et al. (2008) excluded studies that compared similar groups versus dissimilar groups, because attraction within a group is mediated by intra-group factors, therefore not reflecting the pure assessment of interpersonal similarity.

McPherson et al. (2001) distinguished between two types of homophily: baseline homophily (caused entirely by the demographic composition of the pool of potential contacts) versus inbreeding homophily (the part that exists beyond the opportunity structure). This means, if the composition of a group is itself homogeneous, the relationship between its members is naturally homogeneous, which does not require people to have any preferences for similarity to form their network. The focus of homophily is on how interpersonal networks are structured, while affinity bias is about the evaluations and judgments of others.

Kristof-Brown et al. (2005) distinguished between two types of fit: complementary fit, where an individual provides what is missing in the environment (or vice versa), and supplementary fit, where an individual and the environment are similar. Most fit is about the relationship between the person and the organization or environment, while person–supervisor fit specifically describes this relationship between two people. The latter closely relates to affinity bias's context.

== History ==
It has long been recognized that people are more likely to become friends with those who are similar to themselves. For example, Plato observed that similarity begets friendship, while Aristotle noted that people tend to favor those who resemble them. In modern psychology, Social psychologist Donn Byrne established an experimental procedure to investigate this phenomenon in the 1960s, which was widely used by later researchers. He recalled that the inspiration for his research came from observing his father, who evaluated others based on whether their views were in alignment with his own. In Byrne’s 1961 experiment, college students were asked to evaluate a stranger they had never met. The only information provided was the stranger's attitudes (which was actually made up by researchers). Students first completed a 26-item attitude survey in class. Two weeks later, each student received a piece of survey answer where researchers told them it is from another same-gender peer. The given survey answers were designed to be either (1) completely the same as the student's own attitude, (2) totally different, or (3) partially similar (matching half of the questions). After reading the survey answer, students were asked to evaluate that person using 1-7 scales: how much they like that person, and how much they are willing to work with them. The design was clean, excluding other potential factors in reality that may affect the preference.

The study found that the greater the attitude alignment, the higher the scores participants evaluated the stranger. Greenwald and Pettigrew (2014) reported that, when comparing the most similar strangers to the least similar ones, the average effect size was large. In 1965, Byrne and Rhamey named this positive linear relationship between similarity and attraction as the law of attraction.

By 1970, the similarity-attraction principle had extended from attitudes to other broader factors. Greenwald and Pettigrew (2014) pointed out that in workplace settings, evaluations tend to be more positive when the evaluator and the person being evaluated (such as a hiring manager and a job applicant) share the same race or gender. As summarized by Sears and Rowe (2003), early research on interviews reported that the greater the similarity between an interviewer and an applicant, the higher the interview score would be. In 1989, Tsui and O'Reilly introduced the concept of relational demography to examine the demographic characteristics within a dyadic relationship, based on Byrne’s similarity-attraction theory. Researchers in the later periods put together evidence in this area, such as a meta-analysis by Montoya et al. (2008) aggregating data from 313 studies, and a systematic review by Abbasi et al. (2024) including 49 studies conducted in workplace settings.

== Psychological explanations ==
Why people tend to like others who are similar to themselves have long been an interesting and heatedly-debated research question to figure out. Among various explanations, two models have gained the most empirical attention: the reinforcement model and the information processing perspective. Both views are supported by evidence, but also received criticism that is against these. Besides these two, there are also several others models, for example, the repulsion hypothesis.

=== Reinforcement–affect model ===
The model proposed by Byrne was the early dominant model for explaining the similarity effect. According to Montoya and Horton, this model borrows concepts from cognitive dissonance theory and classical conditioning. Byrne pointed out that people like things that reinforce the logic and consistency of their world. Those who agree on our opinions help validate our attitudes, satisfying the need that Byrne called the effectance motive. Similar people to us have this power of reinforcer, thus inducing our positive feelings towards them and increasing attraction. A straightforward summary of this model by Byrne himself is that “people like feeling good and dislike feeling bad”.

This model is supported by some empirical evidence that similar attitudes satisfy the effectance motive, therefore helping building attraction. Research in political choices and consumer preferences has also shown that affect indeed plays a mediating role. However, recent studies found that positive emotions from similar others only partially mediate the similarity effect. Byrne himself acknowledged that a model based only on affect is not sufficiently inclusive, as humans "think as well as feel". He later expanded the model into a behavior sequence model, including additional mediating factors such as cognition and expectancy. A meta-analysis including 240 lab studies tested predictions proposed by this model. Two were supported: (1) the proportion of similar attitudes influences the degree of liking, and (2) the total number of items measuring similar attitudes does not. However, it also revealed that when the information about similarity is more salient, the similarity effect is stronger, which is against the prediction in the original model. Overall, this model is "still used frequently" in similarity research.

=== Information-processing model ===
Another point of view is that whether we like someone or not depends on the information we infer about them based on their similarity or not to us. According to Kaplan and Anderson (1973), people tend to like those who are similar to them because they expect that this person has "various positive aspects to his personality". When evaluating information, people also use themselves as an anchor. Since most people have positive views towards themselves, characteristics similar to their own are perceived as positive. Similarly, if the shared trait is negative, it does no good to liking, because it only conveys negative information about the other person. The more information that could be inferred from a given cue, the more important this cue is. And it also depends on the salience of the information: the more noticeable it is, the greater its impact on one's judgment.

In the same meta-analysis as mentioned above, the authors tested this model's four predictions, and three of them were supported. The only unsupported is that the model predicted that the more the items measuring similar attitudes, the stronger effect (at least before reaching a certain point). But what the results shown were that the number of attitudes had no impact.

=== Other explanations ===
Capacity-willingness model. Montoya and Horton (2014) proposed that attraction is greatly affected by whether I perceive the other person has (1) ability and (2) willingness to act benevolently toward me. They summarized their model as "How 'good' is he or she and does he or she like you?" Condon and Crano (1988) found that once controlling for a participant's inference regarding how a stranger evaluates them, the relationship between similarity and attraction becomes very weak.

Repulsion hypothesis. Rosenbaum (1986) suggested that the positive relationship between similarity and attraction might be the result of repulsion by dissimilar others that push people away. While dissimilar attitudes indeed affect attraction more than similar ones, the basic principle of similarity effect holds true. And there are only four studies that directly test this hypothesis, and their findings are mixed.

Similarity as a cue to competence. In the workplace evaluation setting, people argued that perceived similarity makes evaluators to view the person being evaluated as more competent, besides the liking. According to Dalessio and Imada's (1984) ideal employee hypothesis, the interviewer will compare the candidate against their own model of an ideal employee. Sears and Rowe found in a simulated interview experiment that competence and liking both increase fit ratings, but evidence for competence-based explanations are much more than affect-based ones.

== Dimensions of similarity ==
Similarities between people can be reflected across a lot of characteristics, from demographic attributes such as age, gender, race/ethnicity, and education, to values, personality traits, attitudes, and beliefs. Researchers usually categorize these types of similarity by two ways: (1) surface-level and deep-level similarity, or (2) subjective (perceived) similarity and objective (empirically measured) similarity.

=== Surface-level and deep-level similarity ===
Organizational research usually categorizes similarity (or its opposite, diversity) into two levels: surface-level and deep-level. This is proposed by Harrison et al. (1998), which built on the work of Jackson et al. (1995) and Milliken and Martins (1996). Surface-level diversity refers to the generally unchangeable physical differences such as age, gender, race or ethnicity. They are "almost immediately observable" and easily measured. Deep-level refers to the difference in attitudes, values, knowledge, and skills. These can only be "learned through extended, individualized interaction". In workplace research literature, demographic similarity is related to surface-level similarity, while psychological similarity is similar to deep-level similarity.

Harrison et al. (1998) studied 71 work groups across one hospital and several supermarkets, finding that in groups with a shorter period of working together, the greater the gender diversity among members, the lower the group cohesion. But this relationship diminished in groups that worked together for a longer period. However, the influence of job satisfaction dissimilarity was the opposite: the longer the group worked together, the more harmful such differences were to cohesion. Based on this, the authors argued that the main factor here was the information rather than the time itself, and "demographic factors are often a poor surrogate". Abbasi et al. (2024) noted that demographic similarity plays a role during the early stages of a relationship, while psychological similarity becomes more important over longer periods of employment. Condrea and Iliescu (2026) conducted a meta-analysis on the dyadic relationship between supervisors and subordinates, finding that surface-level similarity had no significant relationship with most work-related outcomes, while deep-level similarity positively related to all outcomes except organizational citizenship behavior.

=== Perceived versus actual similarity ===
Actual similarity refers to the degree to which two people actually share similar characteristics, while perceived similarity refers to the extent to which a person believes themselves to be similar to another person. Montoya et al.'s (2008) meta-analysis found that both actual similarity and perceived similarity are associated with interpersonal attraction. The effect of actual similarity is large in lab studies, but relatively small in field studies. The greater the interaction between two parties, the weaker the effect of actual similarity becomes. Perceived similarity, in contrast, remains influential across various contexts. They concluded that similarity could cause attraction in the lab, but not in existing relationship.

Tidwell, Eastwick, and Finkel (2013) found that actual similarity did not predict whether participants liked each other, but perceived similarity was a strong predictor of liking. Morry (2005, 2007) proposed that the opposite was also likely that attraction can lead to a perception that the other person is more similar to oneself. Condrea and Iliescu's (2026) meta-analysis suggested that the relationship between perceived (subjective) deep-level similarity and job performance is stronger than that between objectively measured deep-level similarity and job performance. But it is unclear whether it is deep-level similarity increases the quality of supervisor-subordinate relationship, or the opposite, that an already positive relationship leads people to perceive one another as similar. As summarized by Abbasi et al. (2024), Orpen (1984) found in a job interview setting that perceived similarity is a better predictor of hiring decisions than actual similarity.

=== Specific attributes ===
Demographic characteristics such as gender and race are the most frequently studied dimensions of similarity in workplace. A study on campus recruitment found that Caucasian recruiters showed a clear bias towards Caucasian applicants, while applicants of the opposite gender actually received higher scores during the interview. For the dimension of educational background, venture capitalists who graduated from the same institution are more likely to co-invest. In hobbies and lifestyles, Rivera (2012) found that recruiters tended to use extracurricular activities listed on resumes as a key indicator of whether a candidate is a good fit. For attitudes and personality, a meta-analysis by Montoya and Horton (2013) found that the effect of attitude similarity is greater than that of personality similarity. According to Abbasi et al. (2024), Roth et al. (2020) found that when participants identified with a job applicant's political view, they perceived the applicant as more similar to themselves, leading to a greater liking for the candidate and higher expectations for their future performance.

== Research methods ==
Researchers usually rely on two methods to test the similarity effect: (1) manipulating the degree of similarity between two people in a lab setting, or (2) measuring the pre-existing similarity between people in real-world organizational contexts. They also used specialized data and meta-analysis methods.

The most classic lab example is the bogus stranger paradigm developed by Donn Byrne, where he manipulated the degree to which how an attitude survey for a stranger matches with the attitude of the participant, and then asked that participant to evaluate this stranger.

In field studies, researchers measure similarity either by comparing objective data such as age and gender (actual similarity) or by directly asking participants that how similar they perceive themselves to be to another person (perceived similarity). The typical approach would be measuring the degree of similarity between supervisors and subordinates or among colleagues, and then see how this relates to performance evaluations. Most workplace research uses a cross-sectional design, which can only show a relationship between similarity and evaluations, therefore can only imply the prediction but not prove it. Another design is the audit study, having two fake applicants who only differ in race apply for the same job. However, these studies often did not report the race of the hiring manager, so it is difficult to see whether any difference comes from similarity.

In interviews and performance evaluations, one recruiter usually needs to evaluate multiple people. So the scores coming from the same person are not independent, which requires to use a multilevel model. Sacco et al. (2003) analyzed a large dataset of campus recruitment interviews using a multilevel model and found no evidence of race or gender similarity effects. McCarthy et al. (2010) also suggested that ignoring nested structure may overestimate similarity effects.

Finally, another way is doing meta-analysis, which aggregates effect sizes from a lot of studies and examines which study characteristics influence the magnitude of these effects.

== Evidence across domains ==
=== Hiring and selection ===
Greenwald and Pettigrew (2014) summarized in their review paper that evaluations tend to be more favorable when recruiters and applicants have the same race or gender. Abbasi et al. (2024) suggested that the most powerful impact the similarity-attraction hypothesis has in organizations would probably be explaining hiring decisions. Sociologist Lauren Rivera conducted a qualitative study where she interviewed 120 recruiters at elite investment banks, law firms, and management consulting firms, and spent nine months observing the recruitment process. She named it as "cultural matching". She found that perceived similarity was the most common way evaluators use during the interview: over half of the evaluators listed fit as the most important criteria in the interview process, and it even carries more weight than work experience or achievements in the initial stage. Approximately four-fifths of evaluators rely on a heuristic known as "airplane test" to determine fit: Imagine your flight was delayed, so you need to wait in the airport alongside with this person. Would you want to spend your time with this person? Additionally, affinity may sometimes change the evaluation criteria themselves. Some interviewers said that they "consciously lower the technical bar" for candidates with whom they hit it off.

According to Abbasi et al. (2024), Graves and Powell (1988) asked recruiters at a university placement center to rate applicants randomly selected from the job interview they just had. The more a recruiter perceived an applicant to be similar to themselves, the more they liked the applicant and the more qualified they perceived them to be. However, they found that similarity itself did not have a direct effect on interview outcomes. It actually had indirect effect mainly through the mediation of subjective qualifications. But in highly structured interviews where interviewees answer same questions and are evaluated via same criteria, several large-scale field studies found that race and gender similarity had small or no significant effects. Sacco et al. (2003) suggested that the similarity-attraction effect was more likely to come up in less structured interviews.

=== Performance appraisal and supervisor–subordinate relations ===
Tsui and O'Reilly (1989) conducted a survey of 272 supervisor-subordinate pairs within a Fortune 500 company, finding that in mixed-gender dyads, subordinates were more likely to be seen as performing worse and were less liked by their supervisors. Condrea and Iliescu's (2026) meta-analysis study found that deep-level similarity were related to better leader-member exchange, higher job performance, greater job satisfaction and lower emotional exhaustion.

=== Teams and organizations ===
Besides the decision made by evaluators, researchers also paid attention to the impact of similarity on colleagues. Guillaume et al. (2012) carried out a meta-analysis study to see how a person's differences from other team members would affect social integration and further the work-related outcomes. They found that surface-level dissimilarity reduced social integration only when team members have a low level of interdependence. Deep-level dissimilarity had stronger effects under high interdependence, and weaker under low. They further pointed out that social integration was a suppressor variable (MacKinnon, Krull, & Lockwood, 2000), since it explained the negative effects of deep-level dissimilarity on individual effectiveness related outcomes. After controlling for social integration, surprisingly, deep-level dissimilarity actually had a positive effect on these work-related outcomes.

At the organization level, Schneider (1987) proposed the attraction-selection-attrition model, where organizations tended to attract and select those similar to existing members, and those who found it difficult to fit into the organization’s environment were easier to leave.

=== Venture capital ===
Gompers et al. (2016) analyzed investment records of over 3,000 venture capitalists between 1973 and 2003, and found that venture capitalists who graduated from the same university or belonged to the same ethnic minority group were more likely to co-invest.

=== Healthcare ===
Shen et al.'s (2018) review paper investigated the influence of racial concordance (i.e., when a physician and patient belong to the same racial group) on patient-physician communication. They found that racial concordance was related to better communication in most domains (such as information-giving, satisfaction, length of visit and participatory decision-making), except communication quality where no difference was found.

=== Friendship and networks ===
People's social networks are strongly homogeneous in a lot of dimensions, where race/ethnicity shapes the strongest divisions, and roughly ordering other factors: age, religion, education, occupation, and gender. Bahns et al. (2017) invited interacting pairs on campus to participate in the study, and found that within-dyad similarity commonly existed among a lot of dimensions. Their follow-up study tracked students who were the first time to meet at that time, and found that those who continued to interact with each other were already more similar to one another even before they met.

== Moderators and boundary conditions ==
Abbasi et al. (2024) pointed out that the similarity-attraction hypothesis is one of the fundamental driver of human behavior, but it could be moderated or even eliminated by some factors. For example, demographic similarity such as age and gender tends to play a role in the initial stage of "impoverished information", while psychological similarities such as personality traits and values worked in the long term.

The level of evaluation structure also matters. Rivera (2012) predicted that in "highly standardized or technical" interviews, the role of fit could be diminished. She cited an interviewer from a consulting firm, that no matter how well a candidate might fit, if they "bombed the case, they were out".

There are more factors that play a role:

- Information salience: Montoya and Horton (2013) found that the similarity effect was stronger when the information about the other person was made more salient before people did rating.
- Cultural individualism: Condrea and Iliescu (2026) found that psychological similarity in supervisor-subordinate relationships was amplified in more collectivistic countries.

== Consequences ==
According to Rivera (2012), favoring those who are similar to us could be benefits and challenges at the same time.

=== Perceived benefits ===
Why do evaluators display cultural similarity? Rivera (2012) mentioned that having colleagues with a similar cultural background makes the demanding weekdays more pleasant, according to some managers she interviewed. She also inferred that because evaluators needed to work with new hires, they easily tended to recruit those who were easy to get along with. Companies also thought that fit in the recruitment stage could help selecting those who were more likely to retain in the organization for a longer period. According to Abbasi et al. (2024), employees liked to work with similar people, which also made the work more productive.

=== Negative consequences ===
Greenwald and Pettigrew (2014) argued that in this era, in-group favoritism is "plausibly" a more important source of discrimination than out-group hostility, because providing conveniences to groups that are already advantageous could already generate unequal treatment, the same as harming disadvantaged groups do. They provided a hypothetical scenario where a manager’s daughter and the daughter of a subordinate, Sylvia, were classmates. In the year-end performance evaluations, the manager gave Sylvia a higher score, but a lower rating to Robert, who did comparable performance as Sylvia but the manager was less familiar with him. The authors claimed that similarity-attraction has no hostile intention, but it could still generate discrimination. A meta-analysis of cooperation experiments by Balliet et al. (2014) summarized that ingroup favoritism, not outgroup derogation, generated intergroup discrimination in cooperation. A review by Hewstone et al. (2002) also pointed out that in social psychology, group-based bias mainly display as a "mild form of in-group favoritism".

Greenwald and Pettigrew (2014) pointed out that ingroup favoritism is very well-hidden, even people themselves did not realize it. For example, if there was vacant position coming up, people tended to recommend their friends, who were as the same race as them due to racial segregation. Rivera argued that the cultural similarity valued by elite firms may relate to extracurricular activities associated with the white upper-middle class, as these activities require long-term investments of time and money from families. Therefore, this "had the potential" to contribute to employment inequality based on parents' socioeconomic status.

== Reducing affinity bias ==
=== Structured interviews ===
A structured interview is an interview format where everything follows some predetermined rules, such as asking all candidates same questions, and having same evaluator interviewing all applicants. Borrowing wisdom from individuating information theory, McCarthy et al. (2010) suggested that appropriately implemented interviews could override the influence of gender and race similarity effect. Large-scale field studies also found that structured interviews show small or no race or gender similarity effects. Greenwald and Pettigrew (2014) claimed that this is because this type of interview format leaves little room for interviewers to make their own subjective discretion.

=== Pre-committing to criteria ===
Uhlmann and Cohen (2005) asked participants to evaluate a male or female candidate for a police chief, which is traditionally considered as a male position. They found that people tended to construct criteria that were advantageous to the male candidate, giving qualifications that males had more weight in the evaluation process. The authors named this phenomenon as constructed criteria. In their following experiment, they asked half of the participants to rate the importance of various qualifications before reviewing candidate descriptions and learning the candidates' genders, and the other half did the same two things but with reversed order. They found that if criteria were not established beforehand, male evaluators displayed a clear bias towards male candidates. But once the criteria were set in advance, it "eliminated gender discrimination".

=== Responsibility structures ===
Kalev et al. (2006) studied 708 private-sector establishments between 1971 and 2002, finding that the most effective practices are those that establish organizational responsibility (i.e., affirmative action plans, diversity staff, and diversity task forces). These also contributed to the broadest increase in managerial diversity.

=== Diversity training and implicit bias interventions ===
Based on their study of actual campus interviews, Graves and Powell (1988) suggested that while recruiters are generally cautioned against gender discrimination, they are far less aware of the potential for other biases, such as the impact of perceived similarity on interpersonal attraction. Training programs could make these types of biases more salient and identifiable, and teach recruiters how to prevent them from influencing their hiring decisions. Scholars also tested interventions to mitigate implicit racial biases in the lab. Lai et al. (2014) compared 17 interventions, and the most effective ways were (1) inducing high self-involvement where as if you were experiencing the scenario yourself, and (2) relating Black people to positive qualities and White people to negativity.

== Criticism and limitations ==
Early criticism about this topic was that the similarity effect may just be a lab phenomenon. Montoya et al.'s (2008) meta-analysis did find that the effect of actual similarity is smaller in field studies than in lab settings. If we take publication bias into account, the effect size would shrink more or even no significant results.

Abbasi et al. (2024) proposed that one of the biggest weaknesses in testing the similarity-attraction hypothesis in organizational settings was that how attraction is conceptualized. Various constructs have been used as proxies for attraction, such as job satisfaction, perceived fit, work-group cohesion, likelihood of transferring from current job, and superordinate conflict, while studies that actually measure liking or interpersonal relationships were rare. They noted that this body of workplace literature gave people the impression that various forms of similarity have been rigorously investigated, but in fact, there was still strong need for studies on directly measuring attraction. They also pointed out that research often treats demographic categories as mutually exclusive. They suggested the intersectionality perspective, such as considering race and gender simultaneously, which may better explain the impact of demographic similarity within the cultural and political aspect.

Last but not least, traditional research on the similar-to-me effect regarded it as a bias if evaluators tended to give higher scores to applicants who were like themselves. However, Sears and Rowe (2003) pointed out that if the similarity is job-itself-relevant, then similarity effect may not be the bias. They found in their experiment that evaluators who scored high in conscientiousness themselves, gave higher ratings for perceived competence and job suitability to those who were also highly conscientious. In contrast, evaluators who scored low in conscientiousness dimension did not show a preference for applicants who were similarly low in this dimension. They actually gave slightly higher scores to applicants who were high in conscientiousness. They suggested that raters who score low on conscientiousness might feel "interpersonally attracted" to individuals similar to themselves, but they "may not recommend them for a job requiring conscientious behaviour".

== See also ==
- Similarity (psychology)
- Halo effect
- In-group bias
- Social identity theory
- Leader-member exchange theory
- Implicit stereotype
- Implicit bias training
- Diversity training
- Employment discrimination
- Old boy network
- List of cognitive biases
