= Hofling hospital experiment =

Psychology field experiment on obedience

In 1966, the psychiatrist Charles K. Hofling conducted a field experiment on obedience in the nurse-physician relationship and compliance with authority. In the natural hospital setting, nurses were ordered by unknown doctors who were researchers in a covert position to administer what could have been a dangerous dose of a (fictional) drug called 'astroten' to their patients. In spite of official guidelines forbidding administration in such circumstances, Hofling found that 21 out of the 22 nurses would have given the patient an overdose of medicine. This was a repeat experiment of Milgrims obidence test.

== Procedure ==
A person would telephone a nurse, saying that he was a doctor and giving a fictitious name, asking the nurse to administer 20 mg of a fictional drug named "ASTROTEN" to a patient, and that he/she would provide the required signature for the medication later. A bottle labelled "Astroten" had been placed in the drug cabinet, but there was no drug of that name on the approved list. The label clearly stated that 10 mg was the maximum daily dose, the nurses were told to give twice the maximum 20mg. The drug gave a placebo effect and was actually a inert sugar pill.

The experimental protocol was explained to a group of 33 participants, twelve nurses and twenty-one nursing students, who were asked to predict how many nurses would give the drug to the patient; through a questionnaire, 31 said they would refuse to give the drug in the questionnaire. Although this group wasn't a true control group as they weren't treated the same as the laboratory experiment.

Hofling then selected 22 nurses at a hospital in the United States for the actual experiment. They were each telephoned by an experimenter who identified himself as Dr. Smith, who asked them to administer the drug and said that he would write up the paperwork as soon as he got to the hospital. Nurses who followed the instruction were stopped by a hidden observer by the door to the patient room before they could administer the "drug".

The nurses should have refused "Dr Smith's" instructions for any one of several reasons:

- The dosage they were instructed to administer was twice the recommended safe daily dosage;
- Hospital protocol stated that nurses should only take instructions from doctors known to them; they should not have followed instructions given by an unknown doctor over the phone;
- The drug was not on their list of drugs to be administered that day, and the paperwork required before drug administration had not been done.

Hoflings

== Findings ==
Hofling found that 21 out of the 22 nurses would have given the patient an overdose of medicine. None of the investigators, and only one experienced nurse who examined the protocol in advance, correctly guessed the experimental results. He also found that 21 of 22 nurses to whom he had given the questionnaire had said they would not obey the orders of the doctor, and that 10 out of the 22 nurses had done this before, with a different drug.

== Conclusions ==
Through the experiment, Hofling was able to demonstrate that people are very unwilling to question those who are considered "authority figures", even when they might have good reason to. This experiment helped illustrate how one could be willing to do something they are ordered to do, even if they know what they are being ordered to do is wrong (such as giving a patient too much of a drug). This study was also very important in relation to the Milgram experiment.

Strengths

- Authentic ,real nurses did their job , it can be replicated easily.

Weaknesses

- it can't show what caused the obedience, failed replication from Rank and Jacobson (1977) , caused distress , deception , no consent was given from nurses.

Rank and Jacobson in 1977 decided to replicate the experiment but failed and found different findings. They found less obedience in the nurses, the researchers phoned 18 hospital nurses and used a real doctors name. The drug was familiar to nurses. 2/18 (11%) were prepared to give the overdose to paitents. The nurses knew the drugs toxic effects and didn't give the overdose due to doctors orders. Although the nurses were allowed to communicate to each other in this test.

== Books ==
- Basic Psychiatric Concepts in Nursing (1960). Charles K. Hofling, Madeleine M. Leininger, Elizabeth Bregg. J. B. Lippincott, 2nd ed. 1967: ISBN 0-397-54062-0
- Textbook of Psychiatry for Medical Practice edited by C. K. Hofling. J. B. Lippincott, 3rd ed. 1975: ISBN 0-397-52070-0
- Aging: The Process and the People (1978). Usdin, Gene & Charles K. Hofling, editors. American College of Psychiatrists. New York: Brunner/Mazel Publishers, ISBN 0-876-30178-2
- The Family: Evaluation and Treatment (1980). ed. C. K. Hofling and J. M. Lewis, New York: Brunner/Mazel Publishers, ISBN 0-876-30233-9
- Law and Ethics in the Practice of Psychiatry (1981). New York: Brunner/Mazel Publishers, ISBN 0-87630-250-9
- Custer and the Little Big Horn: A Psychobiographical Inquiry (1985). Wayne State University Press, ISBN 0-8143-1814-2

== See also ==
- Milgram experiment
- Strip search phone call scam
