= William Bastone =

American editor

William Bastone is editor and co-founder of The Smoking Gun website. In 1997, Bastone and his wife Barbara Glauber, who is a graphic designer, created The Smoking Gun with freelance journalist Daniel Green. In 1984, Bastone worked as an investigative journalist for The Village Voice. He started at The Village Voice as an intern, then worked his way up to being a contributing writer, then ended as a staff writer and investigative journalist. As an investigative journalist, he was responsible for covering City Hall, criminal justice issues, and writing about five of New York's most famous mafia families. TheSmokingGun.com was then bought by Court TV in 2000, enabling Bastone to quit his job with The Village Voice. He also co-wrote a book titled The Smoking Gun: A Dossier of Secret, Surprising, and Salacious Documents.

== Personal ==
Bastone is married to Barbara Glauber, with whom he has one son.
