= Urinal target =

Image placed inside a urinal

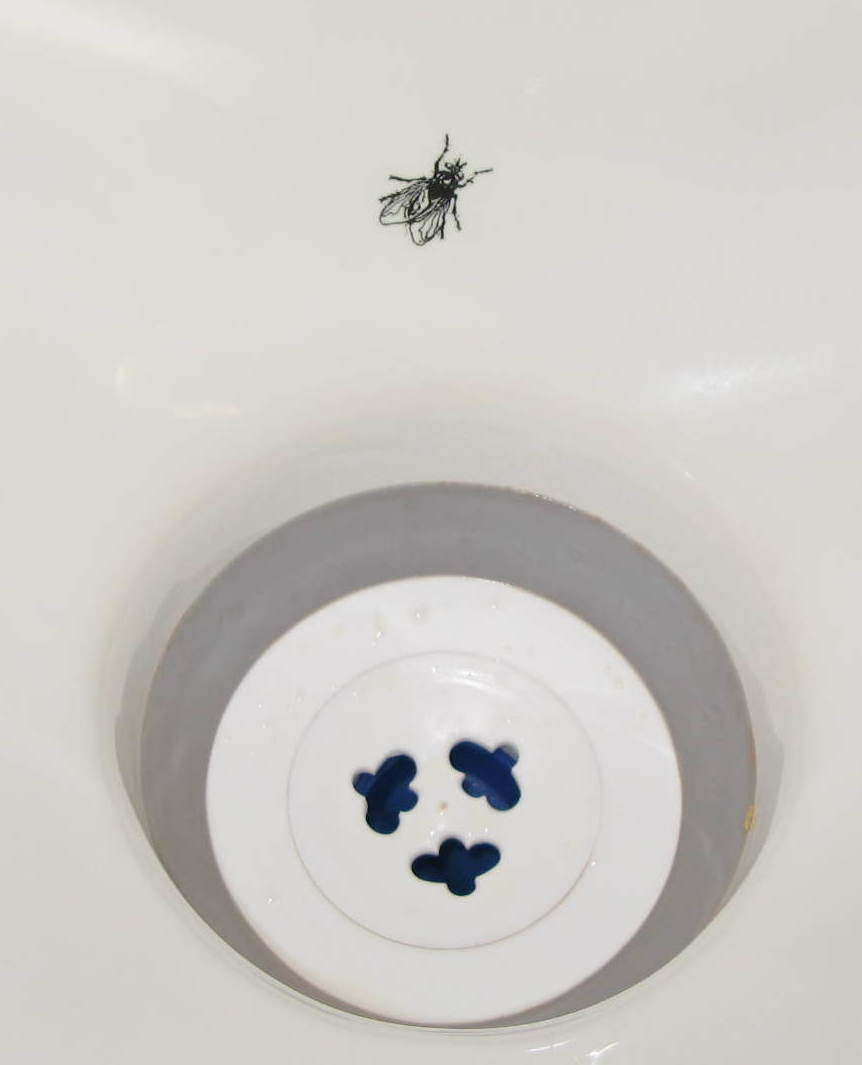
A urinal fly in Switzerland

A urinal target, sometimes known by the specific types urinal fly or urinal bee, is an image or mark placed inside a urinal to encourage users to aim in a particular place so as to avoid messes and reduce cleaning costs.

== History ==
In late-19th century Great Britain, people would put pictures of bees in urinals and toilets. They served as a target, but also a joke about the pronunciation of the honeybee's genus, Apis. Engineer and businessman Thomas Crapper even put a picture of a bee in the toilets his company produced, down below the water. In 1954, an inventor patented a propeller contraption suspended over a toilet, attached from the exterior. In 1976 a dentist in New Jersey patented a bullseye decal he called the Tinkle Target, citing how "parents, janitors, and others responsible for this cleanliness have often despaired the human male sloppiness of failing to direct urine into the proper receptacles".

In the early 1990s, Amsterdam's Schiphol Airport introduced pictures of flies to its men's room urinals in an effort to reduce "spillage", or the amount of urine which spills onto the floor and must then be cleaned. Though sometimes credited to Aad Kieboom, a manager at the airport, according to Kieboom it was the cleaning department's manager, Jos van Bedaf, who had the idea. Van Bedaf remembered, during his time as a soldier in 1960s, that someone had drawn a dot in one of the urinals, and that the latrine with that urinal was cleaner than others. He suggested a fly because, he said, it is the animal people would most like to urinate on. Flies connote unsanitary conditions and are both widely disliked without being frightening like some other disliked insects.

They have been installed in urinals at airports, stadiums, and schools in many places around the world.

In Japan, pictures of ladybugs are also used as urinal targets.

== Functionality ==
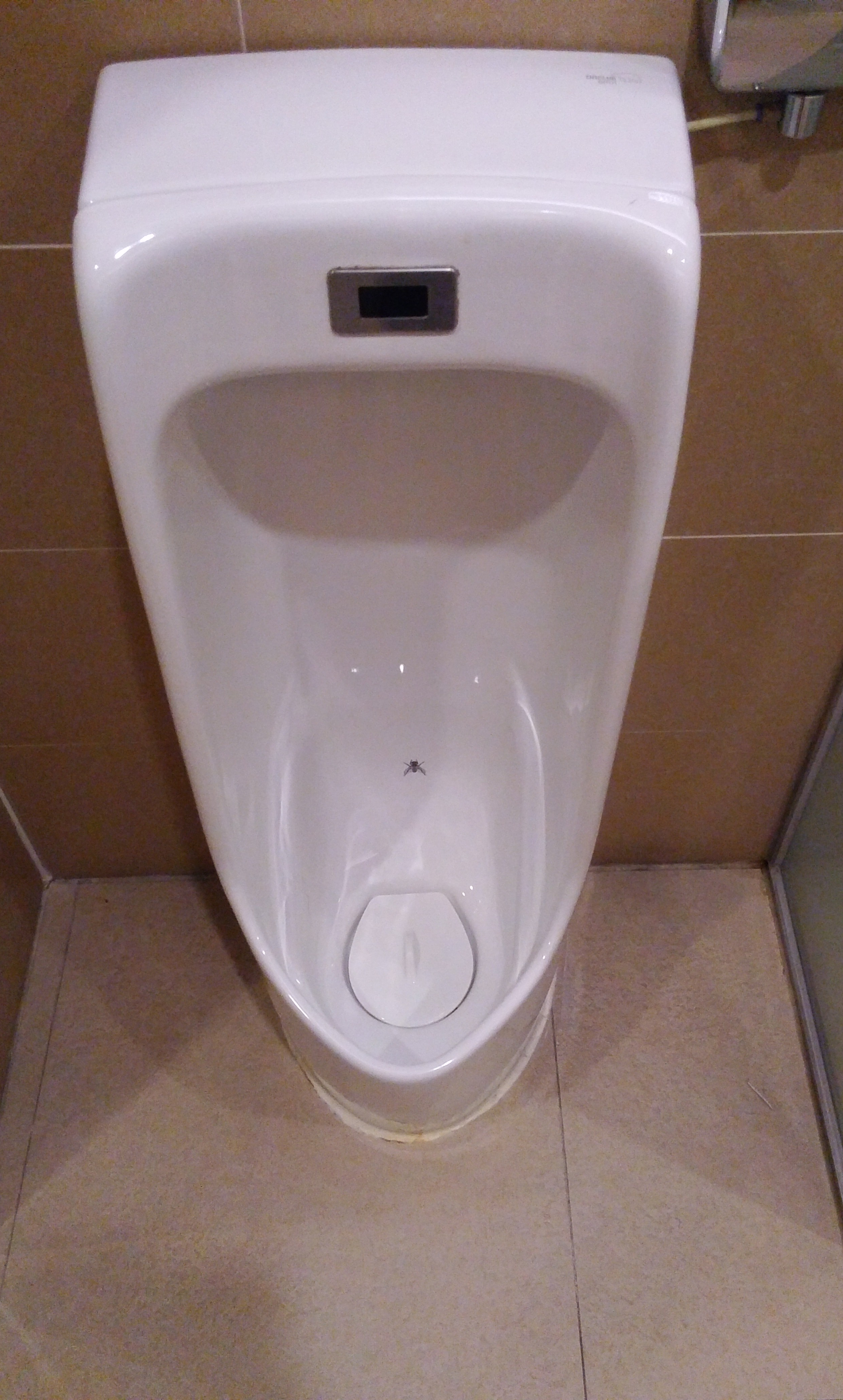
A urinal fly in South Korea

Urinal design often contends with issues of cleanliness, changing their structure or adding elements like screens to avoid spilling or splashing. Targets are one such intervention to get users to direct a stream of urine to an ideal location. While the flies in the Schiphol Airport urinals are etched, they can also be baked into the porcelain or stuck on as a sticker afterwards. One form of sticker is temperature sensitive, with the fly disappearing when heat is applied.

While flies and bees are well-known, targets can also take the form of written words, a dot, a flag, or a tree. Some urinals at the University of Louisville use a logo of the school's rival, the University of Kentucky. In Iceland, some urinals displayed pictures of bankers during the 2008-11 financial crisis. Targets can also be objects like a piece of wood or a Cheerio.

Employees of Schiphol Airport conducted trials to test how effective their etched images of flies were. The result was an 80% reduction in spillage, cutting cleaning costs by about 8%.

Richard Thaler and Cass Sunstein included urinal targets as an example of what they call "nudging" in their 2008 book Nudge: Improving Decisions About Health, Wealth and Happiness. According to nudge theory, positive reinforcement and indirect suggestions can influence the behavior and decision-making of groups or individuals in predictable ways, without using rigid rules. Thaler, a behavioral economist, called it his favorite example of a nudge. Thaler and Sunstein wrote that "It seems that men usually do not pay much attention to where they aim, which can create a bit of a mess, but if they see a target, attention and therefore accuracy are much increased".
