= Sludge theory =

Economic behavioural theory

In behavioral economics, sludge is any form of design, administrative, or policy-related friction that systematically impedes individuals' actions or decisions. It encompasses a range of frictions such as complex forms, hidden fees, and manipulative defaults that increase the effort, time, or cost required to make a choice, often benefiting the designer at the expense of the user's interests.

The concept of sludge highlights the importance of transparent and user-friendly design in promoting welfare, efficiency, and equity in decision-making processes.

Sludge was popularized by behavioral economist Richard Thaler and legal scholar Cass Sunstein. They introduced it as the "dark cousin" of nudging in their book Nudge: Improving Decisions About Health, Wealth, and Happiness.

== See also ==
- Nudge theory
- Choice architecture
- Red tape
