= Choice architecture =

Decision-making concept

Choice architecture is the design of different ways in which choices can be presented to decision makers, and the impact of that presentation on decision-making. In workplace organizations the actual deployment of choice architecture interventions has mostly been found to be agreeable not only to employs but also to the implementers, primarily when the interventions facilitate the consumption of healthy food and physical activity without binding any choices.Choice architecture refers to how options are arranged and presented, and it influences decision making across a wide range of everyday and significant choices.Nudging is a concept in behavioral science, political theory and economics which argues that positive reinforcement and indirect suggestions can influence behavior and decision-making .Research suggests that the activation of personal norms through choice architecture nudges is a particularly effective compared to simply relying on social pressures. Several factors in choice architecture can influence decision- making including:

- the number of choices presented
- the manner in which attributes are described
- the presence of a default option

these elements can significantly affect consumer choice. As a result, advocates of libertarian paternalism and asymmetric paternalism have endorsed the deliberate design of choice architecture to nudge consumers toward personally and socially desirable behaviors like saving for retirement, choosing healthier foods, or registering as an organ donor. These interventions are often justified by advocates of libertarian paternalism in that well-designed choice architectures can compensate for irrational decision-making biases to improve consumer welfare. These techniques have consequently become popular among policymakers, leading to the formation of the UK's Behavioural Insights Team and the White House "Nudge Unit" for example. While many behavioral scientists stress that there is no neutral choice-architecture and that consumers maintain autonomy and freedom of choice despite manipulations of choice architecture, critics of libertarian paternalism often argue that choice architectures designed to overcome irrational decision biases may impose costs on rational agents, for example by limiting choice or undermining respect for individual human agency and moral autonomy. Moreover, it can result in dark patterns because of the principal–agent problem.

== Background ==
The term "choice architecture" was coined by Richard Thaler and Cass Sunstein in their 2008 book Nudge: Improving Decisions about Health, Wealth, and Happiness. Thaler and Sunstein have endorsed thoughtful design of choice architecture as a means to improve consumer decision-making by minimizing biases and errors that arise as the result of bounded rationality. This approach is an example of "libertarian paternalism", a philosophy endorsed by Thaler and Sunstein that aims to "nudge" individuals toward choices that are in their best interest without forbidding options or significantly changing their economic incentives. They go further to say that completely restricting options is no longer a nudge, but simply making something more obvious amongst a group of choices is.

Libertarian paternalism may also be described as soft paternalism.

Behavioral scientists have grouped the elements of choice architecture in different ways. For example, Thaler, Sunstein, and John P. Balz have focused on the following "tools" of choice architecture: defaults, expecting error, understanding mappings (which involves exploring the different ways that information presentation affects option comparisons), giving feedback, structuring complex choices, and creating incentives. Another group of leading behavioral scientists has created a typology of choice architecture elements dividing them into those that structure the choice set and those that describe the choice. Examples of choice set structuring include: the number of alternatives, decision aids, defaults, and choice over time. Describing choice options include: partitioning options and attributes, and designing attributes. The most prominent element amongst those listed above is said the be the use of defaults as it preselects the option that is in the best interest of the consumer, firm, or potentially both.

== Elements ==
Research from the field of behavioral economics has shown that individuals tend to be subject to predictable biases that may lead to decision errors. The following sections describe these biases and describe the ways that they can be minimized by changing decision context through choice architecture.

=== Reducing choice overload ===
Classical economics predicts that providing more options will generally improve consumer utility, or at least leave it unchanged. However, each additional choice demands additional time and consideration to evaluate, potentially outweighing the benefits of greater choice. Behavioral economists have shown that in some instances presenting consumers with many choices can lead to reduced motivation to make a choice and decreased satisfaction with choices once they are made. This phenomenon is often referred to as choice overload, overchoice or the tyranny of choice. However, the importance of this effect appears to vary significantly across situations. Choice architects can reduce choice overload by either limiting alternatives or providing decision support tools.

Choice architects may choose to limit choice options; however, limits to choice may lead to reductions of consumer welfare. This is because, the greater the number of choices, the greater the likelihood that the choice set will include the optimal choice for any given consumer. As a result, the ideal number of alternatives will depend upon the cognitive effort required to evaluate each option and the heterogeneity of needs and preferences across consumers. There are examples of consumers faring worse with many options rather than fewer in social-security investments and Medicare drug plans

As consumption decisions increasingly move online, consumers are relying upon search engines and product recommendation systems to find and evaluate products and services. These types of search and decision aids both reduce the time and effort associated with information search, but also have the power to subtly shape decisions dependent upon what products are presented, the context of the presentation, and the way that they are ranked and ordered. For example, research on consumer goods like wine has shown that the expansion of online retailing has made it simpler for consumers to gather information on products and compare alternatives, making them more responsive to price and quality information.

=== Defaults ===
A large body of research has shown that, all things being equal, consumers are more likely to choose default options. A default is defined as a choice frame in which one selection is pre-selected so that individuals must take active steps to select another option. Defaults can take many forms ranging from the automatic enrollment of college students in university health insurance plans to forms which default to a specific option unless changed.

Several mechanisms have been proposed to explain the influence of defaults. For example, individuals may interpret defaults as policymaker recommendations, cognitive biases related to loss aversion like the status quo bias or endowment effect might be at work, or consumers may fail to opt-out of the default due to associated effort. These mechanisms are not mutually exclusive and their relative influence will likely differ across decision contexts.

Types of default include simple defaults where one choice is automatically selected for all consumers, forced-choice in which a product or service is denied until the consumer makes a proactive selection, and sensory defaults in which the choice is pre-selected based upon other information that was gathered about specific consumers. Choices that are made repeatedly may also be affected by defaults, for instance, persistent defaults may be continually reset regardless of past decisions, whereas reoccurring defaults "remember" past decisions for use as the default, and predictive defaults use algorithms to set defaults based upon other related behavior.

One of the most commonly cited studies on the power of defaults is the example of organ donation. One study found that donor registration rates were twice as high when potential donors had to opt out versus opt into donor registration. However, the influence of defaults has been demonstrated across a range of domains including investment and insurance

=== Choice over time ===
Choices with outcomes that manifest in the future will be influenced by several biases. For example, individuals tend to be myopic, preferring positive outcomes in the present often at the expense of future outcomes. This may lead to behaviors like overeating or overspending in the short-term at the expense of longer-term health and financial security outcomes. In addition, individual projections about the future tend to be inaccurate. When the future is uncertain they may overestimate the likelihood of salient or desirable outcomes, and are generally overly optimistic about the future, for example assuming that they will have more time and money in the future than they will in actuality.

However research indicates that there are several ways to structure choice architecture to compensate for or reduce these biases. For example, researchers demonstrated improved decision-making by drawing attention to the future outcomes of decisions or by emphasizing second best options. In addition, limited time offers can be successful in reducing procrastination.

=== Partitioning options and attributes ===
The ways in which options and attributes are grouped influence the choices that are made. Examples of such partitioning of options include the division of a household budget into categories (e.g. rent, food, utilities, transportation etc.), or categories of investments within a portfolio (e.g. real estate, stocks, bonds, etc.), while examples of partitioning attributes include the manner in which attributes are grouped together for example a label may group several related attributes together (e.g. convenient) or list them individually (e.g. short running time, little cleanup, low maintenance). The number and type of these categories is important because individuals have a tendency to allocate scarce resources equally across them. People tend to divide investments over the options listed in 401K plans they favor equal allocation of resources and costs across individuals (all else being equal), and are biased to assign equal probabilities to all events that could occur. As a result, aggregate consumption can be changed by the number and types of categorizations. For instance, car buyers can be nudged toward more responsible purchases by itemizing practical attributes (gas mileage, safety, warranty etc.) and aggregating less practical attributes (i.e. speed, radio, and design are grouped together as "stylishness").

=== Avoiding attribute overload ===
Consumers would optimally consider all of a product's attributes when deciding between options. However, due to cognitive constraints, consumers may face similar challenges in weighing many attributes to those of evaluating many choices. As a result, choice architects may choose to limit the number of attributes, weighing the cognitive effort required to consider multiple attributes against the value of improved information. This may present challenges if consumers care about different attributes, but online forms that allow consumers to sort by different attributes should minimize the cognitive effort to evaluate many options without losing choice.

=== Translating attributes ===
The presentation of information about attributes can also reduce the cognitive effort associated with processing and reduce errors. This can generally be accomplished by increasing evaluability and comparability of attributes. One example is to convert commonly used metrics into those that consumers can be assumed to care about. For example, choice architects might translate non-linear metrics (including monthly credit payments or miles per gallon) into relevant linear metrics (in this case the payback period associated with a credit payment or the gallons per 100 miles). Choice architects can also influence decisions by adding evaluative labels (e.g. good versus bad or high versus low) to numerical metrics, explicitly calculating consequences (for instance translating energy consumption into greenhouse gas emissions), or by changing the scale of a metric (for instance listing monthly cost versus yearly cost).

== Examples ==
The concept of choice architecture exists in a number of fields. See for example the work of B. J. Fogg on computers as persuasive technologies; the concept of permission marketing as described by Seth Godin. Choice architecture is also similar to the concept of "heuristics," or manipulation that changes outcomes without changing people's underlying preferences, described by political scientist William H. Riker. Choice architecture has been implemented in several public and private policy domains. Variants of the Save More Tomorrow Plan (conceived by Richard Thaler and Shlomo Benartzi), which has individuals commit in advance to allocate a portion of future salary increases to savings, have been adopted by companies to increase employee retirement savings.

Lev Virine and Michael Trumper applied choice architecture concept to project management. They proposed choice engineering as a choice architecture-related framework for improving project decisions. Project managers make predictable, repeated mental mistakes which could lead to project failures. Choice engineering is a creating of processes or environment in which project managers would be steered towards making better choices rather than mandating these choices. The examples of such processes would be using checklists and templates, introducing project audit rather than direct control, providing full disclosure of information for project team members, improving project management education, and other processes. Virine and Trumper argued that in many cases, especially for smaller projects, it would be more beneficial to use choice engineering rather than strict and complex project management processes.

== Criticisms ==
Choice architecture interventions may fail to produce their desired result for several reasons. First, individual differences may lead consumers to respond differently to information. For example, liberals and conservatives have been shown to respond differently to information about the environmental consequences of energy-related behaviors, while individual numeracy has also been linked to different responses to choice architectures.

A second major challenge is assessing whether choice architectures are, in fact, improving decision-making and making people better off as Sunstein and Thaler propose. Questions arise in regards to what constitutes someone as better off and where this standard might come from. Heath recommendations (for example, 60 minutes of physical activity each day) that promote physical wellness can be assessed and the consequences of not meeting these recommendations are well researched and observable. Thus, the use of choice architectures to promote healthy decisions can be easily justified. Though typically choice architecture is implemented with the intention of nudging consumers to socially and personally desirable choices, they can sometimes increase firm profits while decreasing consumer welfare. One way of assessing how a consumer is impacted in this case, is to evaluate consumer experiences after the choice has been made both in the short and long-term.

== Terminology ==
- A choice architect is a person who frames the options (for example, someone who chooses how allied products are displayed in a supermarket).
- Libertarian paternalism is the idea that it is both possible and legitimate for private and public institutions to affect behavior while also respecting freedom of choice.

== See also ==
- Decoy effect
- False dilemma
- Framing (economics)
- Framing effect (psychology)
- List of cognitive biases
- Mental accounting
- Nudge theory
- Sludge theory
- Overchoice
- Propaganda
- Public choice theory
- Selling technique
- Social engineering (political science)
