= Cognitive bias modification =

An example of a cognitive bias modification for interpretation (CBM–I) paradigm utilized in MindTrails, an online program developed by anxiety researchers at the University of Virginia. The program displays a cognitive task that disambiguates a scenario to be either positively or negatively valenced (correct responses highlighted in orange).

Cognitive bias modification (CBM) refers to procedures used in psychology that aim to directly change biases in cognitive processes, such as biased attention toward threat (vs. benign) stimuli and biased interpretation of ambiguous stimuli as threatening. The procedures are designed to modify information processing via cognitive tasks that use basic learning principles and repeated practice to encourage a healthier thinking style in line with the training contingency.

CBM research emerged as investigators used the same techniques to assess attention bias to the manipulation of attention bias. This allowed for tests of the causal relationship between cognitive biases and emotional states (e.g., does selectively attending to threatening information cause greater anxiety). Over time, CBM paradigms were developed to modify biases in other areas of information processing, including interpretation, memory, motivation (e.g., approach–avoidance behaviors), and attributional style. The early success of the procedures in inducing change in bias led researchers to see the potential benefit of CBM as an intervention for emotional and behavioral disorders. Given that the maladaptive cognitive processes implicated in models of emotional vulnerability and dysfunction are targeted by CBM, there is considerable interest in the theoretical and applied importance of the techniques. As such, many recent studies of CBM have targeted cognitive biases in people with anxiety and depressive symptoms.

Research on the effectiveness of CBM in shifting attention and interpretation biases has indicated promising evidence in adult populations, though there are also some null results. Additionally, CBM can reduce anxiety symptoms and stress vulnerability in some cases though these effects are more mixed. There is also some evidence of CBM’s effectiveness in depression symptomatology. Researchers have pointed to the practical benefits offered by CBM, such as scalability and ease of dissemination, potential for augmentation effects with cognitive-behavioral therapy, and cost-effectiveness. Further research on CBM is needed, however, as the evidence for its long-term effects are less clear, including in children.

== Types ==
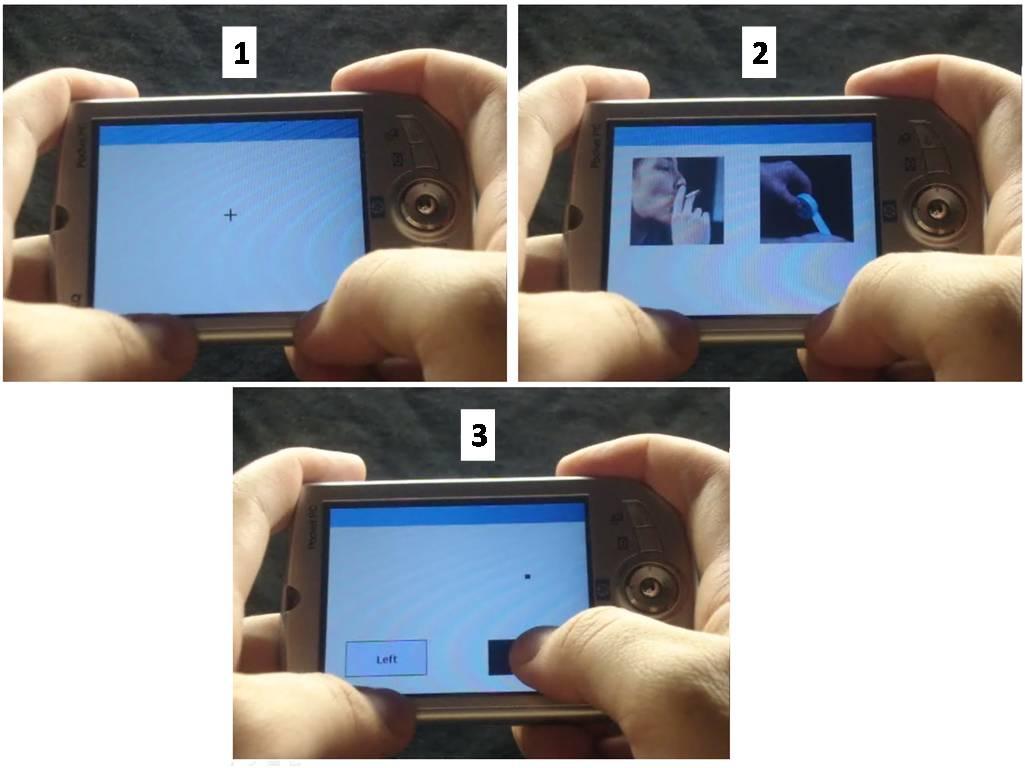
An example of a cognitive bias modification for attention (CBM-A) paradigm. A single trial is presented in which a fixation cross appears, followed by two pictures – one smoking and one neutral. This is followed by a probe to which the individual must respond.

Two common features are used in the majority of CBM methodologies. First, the cognitive bias targeted for change represents a pattern of selective information processing that is known to characterize psychopathology. For example, individuals with anxiety disorders are characterized by an automatic tendency to attend toward threat, while paying less attention to neutral stimuli. Second, the cognitive bias is altered in a manner that does not involve instructing the individual to intentionally change such information-processing selectivity. Rather, change in the cognitive bias is induced by introducing a contingency designed such that successful task performance will be enhanced by adoption of a new pattern of responding.

Two of the most common types of CBM target attention and interpretation biases. Another type of CBM, approach–avoidance training, targets motivation biases associated with approach and avoidance behaviors.

=== Attention bias modification ===
Cognitive bias modification for attention (CBM-A) or attention bias modification (ABM) cognitive tasks are typically designed to draw attention to neutral or positive stimuli, and avoid negative or threatening stimuli. The cognitive tasks utilized in ABM were originally designed for the assessment of attentional bias and later adapted as training tasks.

Common paradigms to manipulate visual attention include the spatial cueing task and visual search task, in addition to the visual probe task. In a typical visual probe trial, a central fixation cross is presented, followed by the brief appearance of a threat and non-threat cue, such as a face with an angry expression and a face with a neutral expression. One of the cues is replaced by a probe, such as a small dot, letter or arrow. The aim is to respond as quickly as possible to identify the probe with a button-press response, for example, to indicate the letter shown or direction of the arrow presented. By having the probe occur routinely in the location where the neutral (rather than negative or threatening) face appeared, the individual learns though practice that attending to the neutral stimulus will enhance their performance on the task because they will be faster to identify the probe.

The logic guiding this training task follows from the assessment version of the task in which the probe appears equally and randomly following the neutral and threat stimuli. In this case, attention bias for threat is inferred from response times to probes. If an individual has a bias to direct attention to the spatial location of the threat stimuli, this should be reflected by faster response times to probes that appear in the same location as threat cues (threat-congruent trials) than non-threat cues (threat-incongruent trials). Conversely, if an individual has a bias to direct attention away from threat stimuli, this should be reflected by slower response times to probes replacing threat than non-threat cues.

=== Interpretation bias modification ===
Cognitive bias modification for interpretation (CBM-I) or interpretation bias modification (IBM) involves cognitive tasks that disambiguate an otherwise ambiguous sentence, paragraph, or picture to be either positively or negatively valenced. Interpretation bias tasks typically aim to increase the extent individuals interpret ambiguous situations in benign ways to encourage more flexible thinking that is less rigidly negative.

The ambiguous situations paradigm is one of the most commonly used protocols used to manipulate interpretation bias. In this task, individuals are typically presented with short paragraphs describing an ambiguous situation. The emotional resolution of the paragraph is not revealed until the end of the paragraph—for example, "You ask a friend to look over some work you have done. You wonder what he will think about what you've written. He comes back with some comments, which are all very positi_e [word fragment in italics]." The resolution often features a word fragment that the individual is asked to solve. By repeatedly practicing assigning non-threatening meanings to the ambiguous situations, the individual is thought to learn that uncertainty is more likely to be resolved in a benign, rather than negative, way. The resolution of the ambiguity is typically reinforced through a brief question following the word fragment completion that requires the individual to respond in a way that matches the situation's ending as determined by the word fragment.

To see whether the ambiguous situations paradigm is successful in modifying interpretation bias, a "recognition" task that consists of a series of ambiguous scenarios is typically used as an outcome measure. In this task, the scenarios remain ambiguous even after solving the word fragment—for example, "You ask a friend to look over some work you have done. You wonder what he will think about what you've written. He comes back with some comments on a Thur_day [word fragment in italics]." In the second part of the recognition task, the titles of the ambiguous scenarios are displayed, together with four sentences per scenario that reflect different ways of understanding what occurred in the scenario that weren't actually stated. These sentences represent: a) a possible positive interpretation tied to the key emotional meaning of the scenario, b) a possible negative interpretation tied to the key emotional meaning of the scenario, c) a positive sentence that is not tied to the key emotional meaning of the scenario, and d) a negative sentence that is not tied to the key emotional meaning of the scenario. Individuals rate each sentence for its similarity in meaning to the original scenario. Higher similarity ratings for the positive (vs. negative) interpretation tied to the key emotional meaning of the scenario are thought to reflect a more positive interpretation.

=== Approach–avoidance training ===
Approach–avoidance training involves cognitive tasks that are designed to induce approach or avoidance behaviors towards specific stimuli. In the approach–avoidance task, a commonly used training protocol, individuals are shown images with a certain distinguishing feature on a computer screen, to which they should react as fast as possible using a joystick. For example, all images tilted to the left are pulled and become larger, while all images tilted to the right are pushed away and shrink in size. This zooming effect creates the visual impression that the pictures are coming closer upon pulling of the joystick, and that they move away upon pushing it.

Training involves selectively inducing avoidance of one type of stimulus and/or approach of another—for example, training avoidance behavior to alcohol-related stimuli for individuals with an alcohol use disorder by repeatedly practicing pushing the joystick when alcohol stimuli appear (and pulling the joystick for comparison stimuli), or training approach behavior to spider stimuli for individuals with arachnophobia by repeatedly practicing pulling the joystick when spider pictures appear (and pushing the joystick for comparison stimuli).

To see whether the training paradigm was successful in modifying approach–avoidance bias, the reaction time when participants are instructed to push away the target stimuli (e.g., alcohol or spider cues) compared to when participants are instructed to push away the comparison stimuli are contrasted, along with the analogous contrast for pulling the target vs. comparison stimuli.

== Criticisms and limitations ==
One concern is whether CBM modification procedures will reliably change symptoms and achieve lasting benefits. This is not yet clear from research.

A 2015 meta-analysis of 49 trials looking at outcomes for anxiety and depression casts doubt on value of CBM. The paper concluded that 'CBM may have small effects on mental health problems, but it is also possible that there are no significant clinically relevant effects.' It notes that research is hampered by small, low-quality trials and by risk of publication bias.

Likewise, a recent meta-analysis has found that although attention bias modification (ABM) can be used as a treatment for several primary characteristics of social anxiety disorder (SAD), the durability of treatment and inability to treat secondary symptoms has been raised as potential issues. In this meta-analysis, the authors assessed the efficacy of ABM for SAD on symptoms, reactivity to speech challenge, attentional bias (AB) toward threat, and secondary symptoms at posttraining as well as SAD symptoms at 4-month follow-up. A systematic search in bibliographical databases uncovered 15 randomized studies involving 1043 individuals that compared ABM to a control training procedure. Data were extracted independently by two raters. All analyses were conducted on intent-to-treat data. Results revealed that ABM produces a small but significant reduction in SAD symptoms (g = 0.27), reactivity to speech challenge (g = 0.46), and AB (g = 0.30). These effects were moderated by characteristics of the ABM procedure, the design of the study, and trait anxiety at baseline. However, effects on secondary symptoms (g = 0.09) and SAD symptoms at 4-month follow-up (g = 0.09) were not significant. Although there was no indication of significant publication bias, the authors identified that quality of the studies was substandard and wedged the effect sizes. From a clinical point of view, these findings imply that ABM is not yet ready for wide-scale dissemination as a treatment for SAD in routine care.

== See also ==
- Cognitive bias mitigation
- Cognitive vulnerability
- Debiasing
- Unconscious bias training
