= Value-action gap =

When a person's values do not correlate with their actions

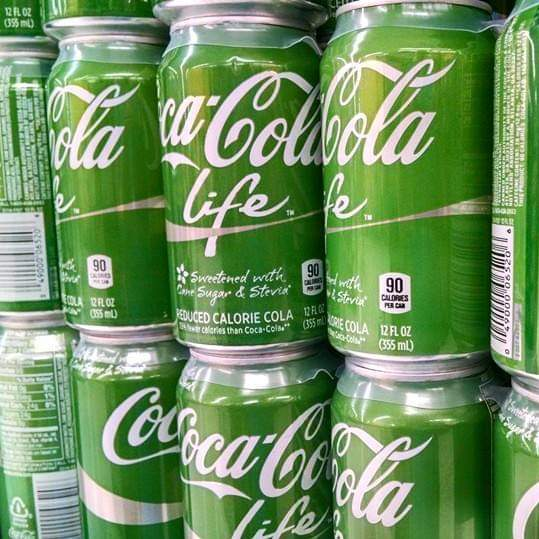
The drink Coca-Cola Life serves as an example of the value-action gap. Extensive market research showed that consumers would buy and enjoy the drink (values) but in reality, once it appeared in shops, not enough people bought it (action). This demonstrates the difference between what people say and what people do

The value-action gap (also called the attitude-behaviour gap, intention-behaviour gap, intention-action gap, say-do gap, belief-action gap, KAP-gap (knowledge-attitudes-practice gap) or belief-behaviour gap) is the discrepancy between the stated values of an individual or organisation and their actions. More generally, it is the difference between what people say and what people do. The phrase is associated with environmental geography, relating to attitudes and behaviours surrounding environmental issues. Numerous studies have reported an increase in global environmental concern, but have shown that environmental engagement is not adjusting in accordance.

Debates surrounding the issue of the value-action gap have mainly taken place within environmental and social psychology and research is often based within cognitive theories of how attitudes are formed and how this affects individuals' behaviour. Pro-environmental behaviour is a term often used in the literature, which can be defined as behaviour that consciously seeks to minimise the negative impact of one's actions on the natural and built world. Research on the factors that influence behaviour, however, have received far less attention than institutional factors such as governments and industries.

The research suggests that there are many internal and external factors that affect behaviour and the reasons behind consumer choices. Therefore, it can be difficult to identify the exact reasons for why this gap exists. When purchasing a product for example, many attributes are assessed by the purchaser in order to make their decision such as; price, quality, convenience, and brand familiarity. These factors influence the reasons behind buying behaviour and environmental considerations are often not taken into account, regardless of the attitudes people have regarding the environment.

Overcoming this gap is of particular importance for environmental policies as finding ways to overcome it should increase the effectiveness of these strategies. This would lead to a fundamental shift in behaviour towards the environment and individuals' use of natural resources, ensuring sustainable development and conservation of the environment. When considering the importance of individual behaviour, it has been stated that national policies and major energy transformations often take decades to change locked-in infrastructure and institutions, but behavioural shifts have the potential to be more rapid and widespread. Additionally, individual behavior ultimately drives societal change via adoption of lifestyle changes and technologies, and support for environmental policies.

== Development of the term ==
=== Summary ===
Theories regarding reasoned action state how attitudes shape and influence behavioural intention, which in term shape actions. The theory of reasoned action states that behavioural intention is dependent on attitudes surrounding that behaviour and social norms. This means that a person acts or behaves in a way that correlates to their attitudes towards that behaviour. Therefore, a person's voluntary behaviour can be predicted by his/her attitudes and values on that behaviour. Homer and Kahle (1988) argue that attitudes influence behaviours and can explain the reasons behind human behaviour. However, this is often not the case for actions related to environmental behaviours.

According to Barr (2004), in recent decades, public support for environmental protection measures has grown. This has been fuelled by pressure groups, consumer groups, and even businesses. Furthermore, increased media coverage of environmental disasters has also resulted in a heightened concern of such issues. This was given a political boost by the publication of the Stern Review on the Economics of Climate Change. Therefore, people are more aware of environmental issues, such as global warming or climate change and it is often reported that many people have a high concern for environmental issues. For example, Dunlap (2002) used survey data which states that 54% of Americans agreed environmental protection was a key priority, even if economic growth was restricted. Furthermore, Banerjee and Solomon (2003) also argue that the general support for Ecolabels is high among the US public. With these studies in mind, it is expected that there would be an increase in pro-environmental behaviour, such as recycling or limiting energy usage. However, a significant increase has not been reported.

Thus, attitudes are not always a clear prediction of behaviour, resulting in the 'value-action gap'. The decision-making process is hard to predict as positive attitudes are not followed by positive intentions, and what shapes behaviour is a complex process. Even if values are high, few people take environmental actions which involve changes to their lifestyle and often environmental actions can be unrelated to particular concerns an individual may have. The result is that attitudes are not necessarily a clear determinant of behaviour.

== Application ==
Even though many support pro-environmental trade in principle, this is often not taken into consideration as a purchase criterion. Cohen and Murphy (2001) argue that for around 40% of consumers the environmental friendliness of a product will never be a factor in purchasing decisions regardless of positive attitudes towards ethical consumption.

There are many studies which support the existence of a value-action gap. Mostly these can be found within the field of environmental geography. This gap has been illustrated by Lane and Potter (2007) who found a discrepancy between attitudes and behavior regarding the adoption of cleaner vehicles. They reported that those with a concern for the environmental impact of cars did not translate this into behavioral changes at the individual level. Thus, consumers stated intention did not reflect their actual behavior. Kuo and Young (2008) showed the presence of an intention-action gap in knowledge sharing practices. They found that the gap could be partly explained by perceived self-efficacy, but not by intention and controllability, and that a person's enactment of intention toward knowledge sharing into behaviors is moderated by their action/state orientation.

This gap is also shown within the market share for environmental goods, as ethical consumerism is still relatively low. Vermeir and Verbeke (2006) point out that initiatives such as legally logged wood, often have market shares of less than 1%, which they argue is partly due to the value-action gap. Even well known, high-profile ethical products still have a small percentage of the market share. Ronchi (2006) reports that the global sales of Fairtrade were over US$83 million in 2003, yet the total value of Fairtrade sales accounts for little over 0.01% of global trade. Thus, consumers’ buying behavior does not reflect their positive attitudes toward ethical products.

Vermeir and Verbeke (2006) also found that there was an inconsistency between the positive attitudes consumer expressed towards sustainability and their behavioral patterns. They found that intentions to buy sustainable dairy products were low regardless of positive attitudes towards these products. They argue that environmental factors are only taken into consideration for a minority of consumers, which means these markets remain small and only attracting a particular niche of consumer. For the majority of consumers other factors are more significant than values relating to the environment when purchasing products. Therefore, positive attitude towards sustainable products are not followed by sustainable actions, contrary to the theory of reasoned action. However, they also found that people's perceptions of the availability of sustainable dairy products was low, which might explain why intentions to buy was low.

== Key issues ==
The main issues surrounding the value action gap are described below:

=== Factors that affect behaviour ===
The key issue is why people's attitudes often fail to materialise into actions. Many factors exist that lead to an individual's behaviour, and therefore it is not just personal values that affect behaviour. Moreover, people's values are not fixed and are negotiated, and sometimes contradictory. Thus, cognitive factors alone will not adequately explain environmental action. Blake (1999) argues that the relationship between attitudes and behaviours is moderated by the structure of personal attitudes themselves; and external or situational constraints. He argues that if attitudes are based on direct experience then they are more likely to be predictors of behavior and behaviours often result from social norms. Behaviours can also be restricted by external or situational constraints which refer to restrictions outside the individual's control, such as economic or political factors.

There are many different theories regarding how consumers make decisions. These can be applied to try to explain why there is a value-action gap for some behaviours. For example, as Sammer and Wüstenhagen (2006:188) point out microeconomic theory (consumer theory) states that, "humans make decisions that maximize their utility". Therefore, if buying environmental products does not maximize an individual's utility then they will not purchase them, regardless of their attitudes towards these issues. Making decisions requires a comparison of the costs and benefits of alternative actions within a specific budget, rather than about certain values. Young et al. (2010) argue that the gap can be due to "brand strength; culture, finance; habit; lack of information; lifestyles; personalities; or, trading off between different ethical factors" (p 22). Moreover, time or convenience can often be the major determinant of consumer behaviour, and therefore the value-action gap is understandable for environmental products, as other constraints are more dominant. This means other factors, such as price or quality, are still more important.

Vermeir and Verbeke (2006) argue that consumers are passive with regard to sustainable consumption, and work within their budget rather than following their values. Furthermore, behaviour is often based on habit and therefore values concerning the environment are usually not taken into consideration. People act impulsively and in ways that do not correspond to their declared evaluations and goals. Moreover, Chatzidakis et al. (2007) argue that consumers use neutralisation techniques to justify pursuing their more selfish goals instead of purchasing environmental friendly products. Environmental values are usually less dominant in the decision-making process. Thus, the main motivation for actions is self-interest rather than altruistic. Therefore, this may account for the low market share of sustainable products.

=== Information deficit ===
The most effective means to overcome the 'value-action gap' is to translate environmental concern into pro-environmental behavior. This may be achieved through increasing information. Therefore, one key explanation for the discrepancy between attitudes and buying behavior is the lack of information on specific issues.

Blake (1999) identifies that the core assumption regarding the value-action gap is that the main barrier between environmental concern and action is the lack of appropriate information. In models of behavior, information generates knowledge, which then shapes attitudes, leading to behavior. Eden (1996) argues that polices fail to understand the gap between information and action. She argues that understanding issues creates awareness and it is this understanding that is the cause of behavior. Hence, it is often considered that one of the most effective ways to encourage pro-environmental behavior is to highlight important facts relevant to the issues. This is referred to as the ‘information deficit model’ of behavior change, which is based on the assumption that providing knowledge about the consequences of certain actions, would lead to a change in behavior. Environmental education and new knowledge is one way in which these environmental messages can be delivered, and therefore filling the value-action gap with information could help towards a change public behaviors. Furthermore, Owens (2000: 1142) argues that “if people had more information about environmental risks, they would become more virtuous”.

Traditional thinking supported this idea that increased knowledge tended to encourage favorable attitudes which, in turn, lead to pro-environmental action. This relates to broader issues relative to methods of environmental governance. Attempts by government to affect public behavior have traditionally been based on increasing environmental awareness. Many environmental policies are based on this ‘information deficit model’ as policy-makers assume knowledge on certain issues will lead people to act in order to meet policy objectives. Owens (2000) points out that governments often aim to encourage action through big publicity campaigns and changing behavior. For example, the UK government's ‘Are You Doing Your Bit?’ campaign which was launched in 1998 aimed to develop public understanding of sustainable development, and thus, to encourage a change in behavior of individuals. Additionally, many Non-governmental organizations (NGOs) campaign for increasing awareness, on the assumption that this will lead to action. Some argue that to increase environmental action there needs to be educational marketing campaigns on the environmental issues to change people's attitudes towards these issues, and thus change their behavior.

However, the effect of information on behavioral change is debatable. Different people will respond and interpret the same environmental information in various ways and sometimes it is interpreted in an opposite way to what is expected. Barr and Gilg (2002) argue that just increasing information will not lead to a behavior change that would close this gap, and information-intensive campaigns are likely to be unproductive. Due to the increased media attention surrounding environmental issues and organizations such as Greenpeace having a high profile, it could be argued that there is already a lot of information on these issues, and it is considered that general awareness on environmental issues is high. Sammer and Wüstenhagen (2006) point out that while people may be aware of environmental issues, this does not necessarily mean that they play a major role in their actions. These findings suggest that the 'value-action gap' cannot be overcome simply by using an 'information deficit' model of individual participation. Increasing information does not itself guarantee action at the individual level and information campaigns intended to raise awareness are not as effective as some may suppose.

This raises issues regarding the effectiveness of methods used by NGOs, whose activities generally involve awareness campaigns and the use of non-state market driven (NSMD) forms of governance which rely on consumers to create change. If attitudes are not translated into behavior then these methods are essentially flawed. This would suggest that other methods are more appropriate to encourage environmental action, such as regulation and economic incentives (taxes and grants).

=== Barriers to behaviour ===
It is widely considered that many other barriers exist, besides a lack of information, which inhibit ethical behaviour causing a value-action gap to exist.

Retallack et al. (2007) identifies other barriers such as uncertainty, skepticism about the issue and distrust of national governments and organizations. Jackson (2005) uses the concept of 'bounded rationality' to explain how individuals' decision making processes are 'bounded' by psychological and environmental constraints.

Blake (1999) points out that various models of behaviour are flawed in that they fail to take into consideration the social, individual and institutional constraints. Various conditions and personal day-to-day responsibilities constrain actions that can be regarded as ethical. Blake identifies that this gap is not empty, but is filled with barriers that block the progress from environmental concern to environmental action. In his model, action is blocked by many factors intruding into the process, rather than just a lack of information. Thus, the cause of the value-action gap can be explained in terms of personal, social and structural barriers to action. Blake identifies three categories of obstacles that exist between the environmental concern and action: individuality; responsibility and practicality. However, which factors are important will vary for different individuals and environmental actions. Moreover, barriers often overlap and are combined which limits behavioural change.

- Individual barriers refer to environmental concerns being outweighed by other conflicting attitudes. People may perceive themselves as the wrong type of person to carry out ethical actions or have a lack of interest in environmental issues, e.g. a divorce of position.
- Responsibility barriers refers to the idea that people may not act, despite supporting environmental action, because they believe it is not their responsibility to help solve environmental problems. This is supported by Jackson (2005) who identifies that the acceptance of personal responsibility for one's actions, and their consequences, is the basis for the intention to perform a pro-environmental behaviour. People may also not act because they possess a lack of trust for national governments and organizations which aim to tackle environmental issues, e.g. cynicism.
- Finally, practical constraints prevent people from adopting pro-environmental action, regardless of their attitudes or intentions. These include lack of time, money, physical storage space (in the case of recycling), encouragement and pro-environmental facilities such as recycling and adequate public transport provision. Some people may also be physically unable to carry out some environmental actions, e.g. space limitations.

Therefore, Blake argues that policies need to tackle these barriers, not just provide more information or recycling facilities.

== See also ==
- Attitude-behavior consistency
- Do as I say not as I do
- Eco-innovation diffusion
- Environmental psychology
- Moral psychology
- Nudge theory
- Social marketing
- Social psychology
