= Cognitive vulnerability =

Concept in cognitive psychology

A cognitive vulnerability in cognitive psychology is an erroneous belief, cognitive bias, or pattern of thought that predisposes an individual to psychological problems. The vulnerability exists before the symptoms of a psychological disorder appear. After the individual encounters a stressful experience, the cognitive vulnerability shapes a maladaptive response that increases the likelihood of a psychological disorder.

In psychopathology, there are several perspectives from which the origins of cognitive vulnerabilities can be examined, including cognitive schema models, hopelessness models, and attachment theory. Attentional bias is one mechanism that produces faulty cognitive bias, leading to cognitive vulnerability. Allocating a danger level to a threat depends on the urgency or intensity of the threshold. Anxiety is not associated with selective orientation.

== Theories ==
=== Cognitive theory ===
Preliminary or "distal" causes contribute to the formation of a cognitive vulnerability that ultimately, via immediate or proximal causes, leads to the individual manifesting symptoms of the disorder. Immediate cognitive and emotional responses trigger imagery and assumptions formed in the past, leading to offsetting, defensive behavior that in turn reinforces mistaken beliefs or other cognitive vulnerabilities.

=== Attachment theory ===
The contact made with caretakers determines a certain attachment process. When secure attachment is disrupted and starts to become insecure, abnormal patterns begin, increasing risk for depression. Working models build perceptions of relationships with others. Cognitive vulnerability is created with maladaptive cognitive processing when building relationships and attachments.

== The diathesis-stress relationship ==
Diathesis contributes to vulnerability. The diathesis refers to the inclination to illness. In the diathesis-stress relationship, hidden vulnerability is activated through events that the individual perceives as stressful. In psychological terms, vulnerability implies an increased probability of emotional pain and some type of psychopathology. Vulnerability can arise from a combination and interaction of genetic factors and acquired experiences. Vulnerability leads to putting up with something unpleasant and represents symptoms of various psychological disorders. Vulnerability predisposes individuals to a disorder, but does not initiate the disorder. Depending on the individual's subjective perception of an event, the diathesis leads to a certain psychological illness.

== Psychological problems ==
=== Depression ===
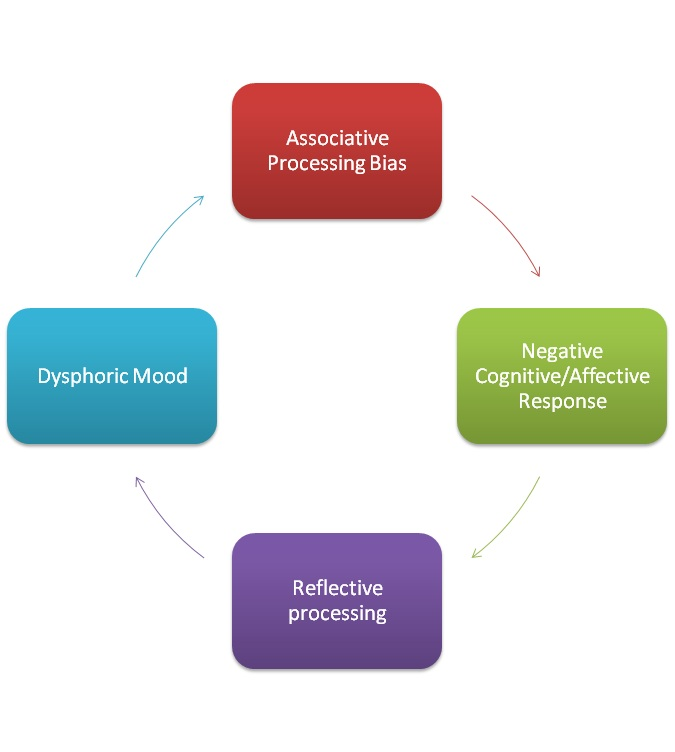
Diagram of the downward spiral in the dual process model of depression

Through several cognitive biases, selective mood-congruent cues become established over long intervals. Emotional stimuli matching the emotional concerns create an aggregate effect on symptoms related to depression. Depression is associated with selective orientation. It prevents attention toward emotional cues that do not fit the internalized scheme to which the individual has become vulnerable, and leads to comorbid anxiety. When individuals who are prone to depression are asked to recall a specific event, they instead describe a general class of events (e.g., "The time when I was living with my parents").

==== Dual process model ====
Associative and reflective processing mechanisms apply when cognitive vulnerability is processed into depression. The dual process model is valid in social and personality psychology but is not adapted to clinical phenomena. Negative bias in self-assessment provides a foundation for a cognitive vulnerability to depression. A downward spiral then leads to forms of dysphoria. Negatively biased associative processing will maintain a dysphoric mood state. As the dysphoric mood escalates, cognitive resources necessary for combating dysphoria by reflective processing are depleted. Irrelevant tasks and intrusive thoughts come to mind when in a dysphoric mood, and cognitive resource depletion further contributes to mood escalation.

===== Feedback loop =====
The feedback loop in the dual process model is between self-referent cognition and dysphoria. The feedback loop establishes an inability to apply reflective processing to correct negative biases.

===== Mood persistence =====
Postponing the reflective processes leads to mood persistence. The individual becomes accustomed to a state of dysphoria as they experience more and more negative mood states. In people vulnerable to depression, dysphoric moods increase associative processing through negative cognitive biases. When associative bias gets stronger, the bias becomes difficult to override. Ineffective reflective strategies lead to persistence of dysphoric moods.

==== A depressive episode as a vulnerability factor for depression ====
The likelihood of another depressive episode escalates with the number of previous episodes. A depressive episode by itself is a vulnerability factor. Each episode of depression makes it easier for the neurotransmitter system to become dysregulated. A strong stressor is needed for the first episode; however, subsequent episodes can be triggered by increasingly mild stressors. Contextual information develops such that small changes in mood are sufficient to activate vulnerability. Weakening and frequency of depressive episodes triggers the biological processes related to the initial episode. Depressive episodes are experienced as a lack of control over traumatic events. A depressive condition results in social rejection and lowered self esteem, leading to further depressive symptoms.

==== Schema models ====
Schemas in depression are formed in association with stressful events in childhood and condition the individual to respond in an abnormal manner to life experiences that recall those childhood traumas. During childhood and adolescence, the individual who is prone to depression begins to match life situations with prototypes of specific stressful experiences from childhood. The cognitive vulnerability thus manifests itself.

=== Learned helplessness ===
Negative events during childhood lead the child to internalize them. Just as repeated positive experiences lead the child to develop a positive self image and optimism regarding future events, negative events lead to the development of expectations of hopelessness or even depression when the individual faces a stressful situation in the future.

=== Bipolar disorder ===
A study of people with bipolar disorder found that, compared with non-bipolar controls, they had significantly higher levels of dysfunctional attitudes such as perfectionism and need for approval that increase their cognitive vulnerability to depression.

== See also ==
- Animal cognition
- Cognitive behavioral therapy (CBT)
- Cognitive bias
- Cognitive bias mitigation
- Cognitive bias modification
- Cognitive dissonance
- Cognitive distortion
- Cognitive linguistics
- Cognitive module
- Cognitive space
- Cognitive style
- Cognitive therapy (CT)
- Comparative cognition
- Debiasing
