= 1978 Chilean political programme referendum =

Augusto Pinochet asks for public support of his government

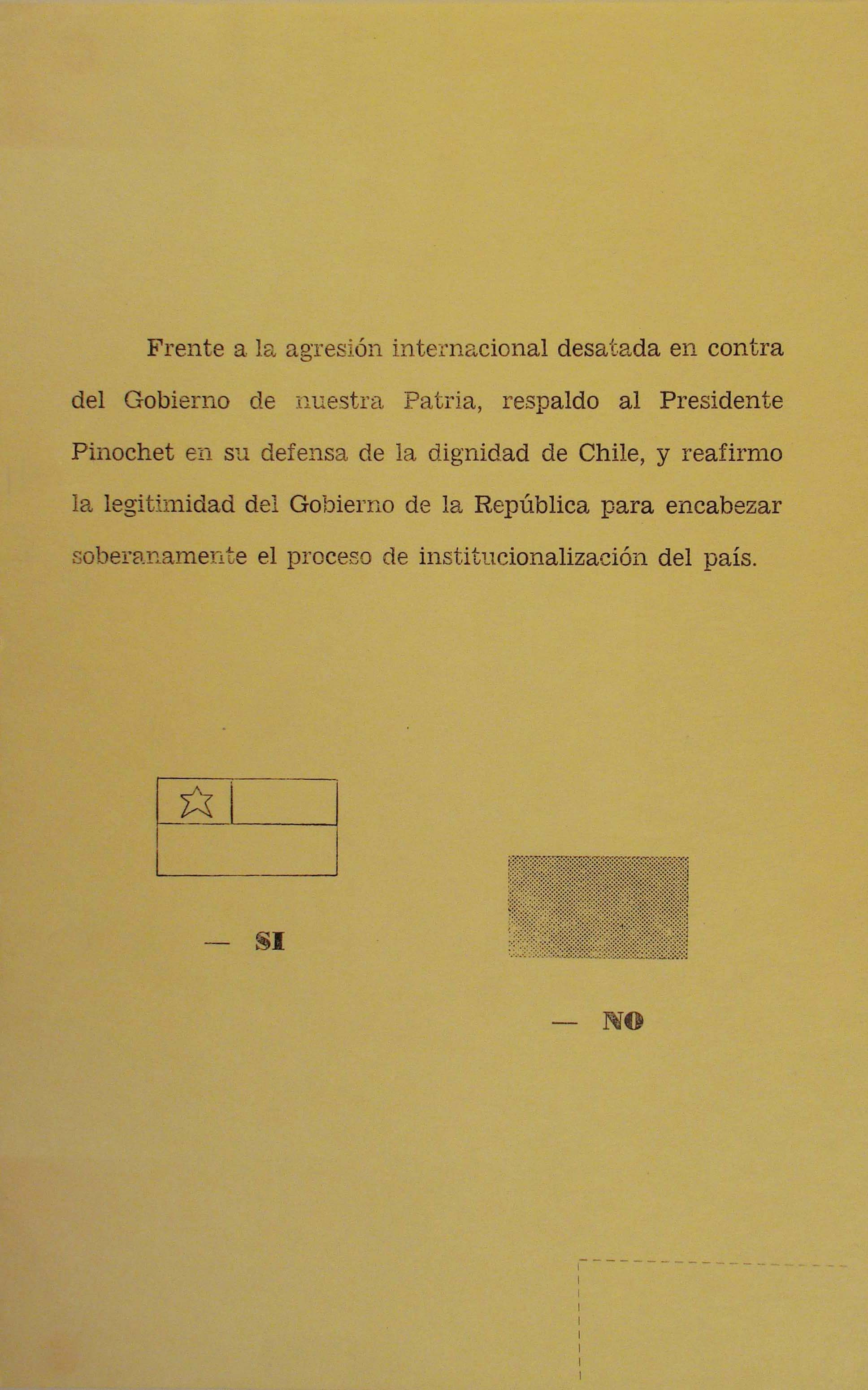
Ballot used in the referendum.

A national consultation on President Augusto Pinochet's political program was held throughout Chile on 4 January 1978. After being accused of human rights violations by the United Nations, Pinochet announced a national vote to confirm support for his policies. The 'yes' field of the ballot featured a Chilean flag, while the 'no' field featured a solid black rectangle to nudge the vote in favor of Pinochet.

== Results ==
Given the international aggression against the government of our country, I support President Pinochet in his defense of the dignity of Chile, and I confirm again the legitimacy of the Government of the Republic in its sovereign head of the institutionalization process in the country.
Choice	Votes	%
For	4,012,023	78.60
Against	1,092,226	21.40
Total	5,104,249	100.00
Valid votes	5,104,249	95.42
Invalid/blank votes	244,923	4.58
Total votes	5,349,172	100.00
Source: Base de Datos de Elecciones en Chile
