= Organizing principle =

Central dimension of a conceptual framework

An organizing principle is a core assumption from which everything else by proximity can derive a classification or a value. It is like a central reference point that allows all other objects to be located, often used in a conceptual framework. Having an organizing principle might help one simplify and get a handle on a particularly complicated domain or phenomenon. On the other hand, it might create a deceptive prism that colors one's judgment.

== Examples ==
- In a Brookings Institution article, James Steinberg describes how counter-terrorism has become the organizing principle of U.S. national security.
- The idea of the Solar System is based on the organizing principle that the Sun is located at a central point, and all planets revolve around it.
- Most modern cities are based on the organizing principle of the Grid plan in order to better manage transportation and addressing.
- Most religions can be described by social scientists as built around an organizing principle that allows for the sustainable or improvable recursion of a unique population.
- Organizations can be constructed around a set of organizing principles, such as concepts, priorities, or goals. For example, an organization may intend to be innovative, international, quality and agile.
- The central organising principle of the Welsh Government is sustainability.
- Legitimation code theory is an explanatory framework in the sociology of knowledge and education that seeks to understand different social fields of practices in terms of their organizing principles, which determines the basis of success and failure.
- The organizing principle of the aphorism "as above, so below" is based on man's primordial sense of up and down and that this sense is a result of the symmetries in nature.
- Theism holds that there is a cause for things that are evidently effects or passive to a force or action and that this involves a vital force that produces effects that demonstrate design and concordance.

== See also ==
- Unit of analysis
- Concept-driven strategy
- Frame analysis
- Framing
- Pragmatism
- Attractor
