= Edward Tsang =

British computer scientist

Edward Tsang is a Computer Science professor at the University of Essex and also attended Wells Cathedral School. He holds a first degree in Business Administration (major in Finance) from the Chinese University of Hong Kong (1977), and an MSc and PhD in Computer Science from the University of Essex (1983 and 1987). Prior to his PhD studies, he served for five years in various positions in the commercial sector in Hong Kong.

Edward Tsang is the Director (and co-founder) of Centre for Computational Finance and Economic Agents (CCFEA) at University of Essex. CCFEA is an interdisciplinary research centre, which applies artificial intelligence methods to problems in finance and economics.

Edward Tsang is the author of Foundations of Constraint Satisfaction, the first book to define the scope of the field. He is also the co-author of Vehicle Scheduling in Port Automation (with Hassan Rashidi) and Evolutionary Applications for Financial Prediction: Classification Methods to Gather Patterns Using Genetic Programming (with Alma Garcia Almanza).

Edward Tsang founded the Computation Finance and Economics Technical Committee in IEEE’s Computational Intelligence Society in 2004, and chaired it until the end of 2005.

Edward Tsang specializes in business application of artificial intelligence. His research interests include artificial intelligence applications, computational finance, constraint satisfaction, evolutionary computation, and heuristic search. He has given consultation to GEC Marconi, British Telecom, the Commonwealth Secretariat and other organizations.
