= Libertarian paternalism =

Political and sociological concept

Libertarian paternalism is the idea that it is both possible and legitimate for private and public institutions to affect behavior while also respecting freedom of choice, as well as the implementation of that idea. The term was coined by behavioral economist Richard Thaler and legal scholar Cass Sunstein in a 2003 article in the American Economic Review. The authors further elaborated upon their ideas in a more in-depth article published in the University of Chicago Law Review that same year. They propose that libertarian paternalism is paternalism in the sense that "it tries to influence choices in a way that will make choosers better off, as judged by themselves" (p. 5); note and consider, the concept paternalism specifically requires a restriction of choice. It is libertarian in the sense that it aims to ensure that "people should be free to opt out of specified arrangements if they choose to do so" (p. 1161). The possibility to opt out is said to "preserve freedom of choice" (p. 1182). Thaler and Sunstein published Nudge, a book-length defense of this political doctrine, in 2008 (new edition 2021).

Libertarian paternalism is similar to asymmetric paternalism, which refers to policies designed to help people who behave irrationally and so are not advancing their own interests, while interfering only minimally with people who behave rationally. Such policies are also asymmetric in the sense that they should be acceptable both to those who believe that people behave rationally and to those who believe that people often behave irrationally.

== Examples of policies ==
Setting the default in order to exploit the default effect is a typical example of a soft paternalist policy. Countries that have an "opt-out" system for voluntary organ donation (anyone who did not explicitly refuse to donate their organs in the case of accident is considered a donor) experience dramatically higher levels of organ donation consent, than countries with an opt-in system. Austria, with an opt-out system, has a consent rate of 99.98%, while Germany, with a very similar culture and economic situation, but an opt-in system, has a consent rate of only 12%.

Cab drivers in New York City have seen an increase in tips from 10% to 22% after passengers had the ability to pay using credit cards on a device installed in the cab whose screen presented them with three default tip options, ranging from 15% to 30%.

Until recently, the default contribution rate for most tax-deferred retirement savings plans in the United States was zero, and despite the enormous tax advantages, many people took years to start contributing if they ever did. Behavioral economists attribute this to the "status quo bias", the common human resistance to changing one's behavior, combined with another common problem: the tendency to procrastinate. Research by behavioral economists demonstrated, moreover, that firms which raised the default rate instantly and dramatically raised the contribution rates of their employees.

Raising default contribution rates is also an example of asymmetric paternalism. Those who are making an informed deliberate choice to put aside zero percent of their income in tax deferred savings still have this option, but those who were not saving simply out of inertia or due to procrastination are helped by higher default contribution rates. It is also asymmetric in the second sense: If you do not believe that defaults matter, because you believe that people will make rational decisions about something as important as retirement saving, then you should not care about the default rate. If you believe that defaults matter, on the other hand, you should want to set defaults at the level that you believe will be best for the largest number of people.

== Criticism of the choice of term ==
There has been much criticism of the ideology behind the term, libertarian paternalism. For example, it has been argued that it fails to appreciate the traditional libertarian concern with coercion in particular, and instead focuses on freedom of choice in a wider sense. Others have argued that, while libertarian paternalism aims to promote wellbeing, there may be more libertarian aims that could be promoted, such as maximizing future liberty.

== See also ==
- Choice architecture
- List of cognitive biases
- Nudge theory
- Tax choice – soft paternalism approach to taxation
