= Nudge (book) =

2008 book by Richard H. Thaler and Cass R. Sunstein

Nudge: Improving Decisions about Health, Wealth, and Happiness
- Author: Richard H. Thaler; Cass R. Sunstein
- Language: English
- Genre: Non-fiction
- Publisher: Yale University Press
- Publication date: April 8, 2008
- Pages: 312
- ISBN: 978-0-300-12223-7
- OCLC: 791403664

Nudge: Improving Decisions about Health, Wealth, and Happiness is a book written by University of Chicago economist and Nobel laureate Richard H. Thaler and Harvard Law School professor Cass R. Sunstein, first published in 2008. In 2021, a revised edition was released, subtitled The Final Edition.

The book draws on research in psychology and behavioral economics to defend libertarian paternalism and active engineering of choice architecture. The book also popularized the concept of nudge theory. A nudge, according to Thaler and Sunstein is any form of choice architecture that alters people's behaviour in a predictable way without restricting options or significantly changing their economic incentives. To count as a mere nudge, the intervention must require minimal intervention and must be cheap.

The book received largely positive reviews. The Guardian described it as "never intimidating, always amusing and elucidating: a jolly economic romp but with serious lessons within." It was named one of the best books of 2008 by The Economist.

== Summary ==
=== Human behavior ===
One of the main justifications for Thaler's and Sunstein's endorsement of libertarian paternalism in Nudge draws on facts of human nature and psychology. The book is critical of the homo economicus view of human beings "that each of us thinks and chooses unfailingly well, and thus fits within the textbook picture of human beings offered by economists".

They cite many examples of research which raise "serious questions about the rationality of many judgments and decisions that people make". They state that, unlike members of homo economicus, members of the species homo sapiens make predictable mistakes because of their use of heuristics, fallacies, and because of the way they are influenced by their social interactions.

==== Two systems of thinking ====
The book describes two systems that characterize human thinking, which Sunstein and Thaler refer to as the "Reflective System" and the "Automatic System". These two systems are more thoroughly defined in Daniel Kahneman's book Thinking, Fast and Slow.

The Automatic System is "rapid and is or feels instinctive, and it does not involve what we usually associate with the word thinking". Instances of the Automatic System at work include smiling upon seeing a puppy, getting nervous while experiencing air turbulence, and ducking when a ball is thrown at you.

The Reflective System is deliberate and self-conscious. It is the one at work when people decide which college to attend, where to go on trips, and (under most circumstances) whether or not to get married.

==== Fallacies and biases ====
Because of these differences and conflicts between these systems, people are often subject to making mistakes that are the result of widely occurring biases, heuristics, and fallacies. These include:

Name	Description
Anchoring	A cognitive bias wherein one relies too heavily on one trait or piece of information. An example would be a resident of Chicago who is asked to guess the population of Milwaukee. Knowing that Milwaukee is a major city, but certainly not as large as Chicago, the person would take the population of Chicago (roughly 3 million) and divide it by, say, three (arriving at one million). A resident of Green Bay (which has a population of around 100,000) might know that Milwaukee is larger than Green Bay, and triple the population of their home city to arrive at a guess (of 300,000). The difference in guesses of people because of their geographical location is an instance of anchoring. The real population of Milwaukee is about 580,000.
Availability heuristic	When people predict the frequency of an event based on how easily an example can be brought to mind. The authors state that this could help explain why people think that homicides occur more than suicides, as examples of homicides are more readily available. The availability heuristic can have negative effects in business and politics, because people will overstate risks, resulting in people purchasing unnecessary insurance, or governments pursuing social goals at the expense of other more fruitful ones.
Representativeness heuristic	Where people judge the probability or frequency of a hypothesis by considering how much the hypothesis resembles available data. An example would be perceiving meaningful patterns in information that is in fact random. These include false accounts of "cancer clusters" and the common belief in basketball that players can get "hot". Due to the number of shots taken, players are bound to have times when they score many shots in a row, but basketball fans wrongly believe that a player that has just made a series of shots is more likely to make their next shot.
Status quo bias	This is when people are very likely to continue a course of action since it has been traditionally the one pursued, even though this course of action may clearly not be in their best interest. An example of the status-quo bias at work would be when magazine companies offer trials of their magazines for free, but then, after the trial has ended, continue to send magazines and charge the customer until he or she actively end the subscription. This leads to many people receiving and paying for magazines they do not read.
Herd mentality	People are heavily influenced by the actions of others. Sunstein and Thaler cite a famous study by Solomon Asch where people, due to peer pressure, answer certain questions in a way that was clearly false (such as saying that two lines are the same length when they clearly are not).

=== Libertarian paternalism ===
Libertarian paternalism (also called soft paternalism) is the union of two political notions commonly viewed as being at odds: libertarianism and paternalism.

Sunstein and Thaler state that "the libertarian aspect of our strategies lies in the straightforward insistence that, in general, people should be free to do what they like-and to opt out of undesirable arrangements if they want to do so". The paternalistic portion of the term "lies in the claim that it is legitimate for choice architects to try to influence people's behavior in order to make their lives longer, healthier, and better".

Choice architecture describes the way in which decisions are influenced by how the choices are presented. People can be "nudged" by arranging the choice architecture in a certain way without taking away the individual's freedom of choice. A simple example of a nudge would be placing healthy foods in a school cafeteria at eye level while putting less-healthy junk food in harder-to-reach places. Individuals are not actually prevented from eating whatever they want, but arranging the food choices that way causes people to eat less junk food and more healthy food.

=== Policy recommendations ===
Sunstein and Thaler apply the idea of nudges in the context of choice architecture to propose policy recommendations in the spirit of libertarian paternalism. They have recommendations in the areas of finance, health, the environment, schools, and marriage. They believe these problems can at least be partially addressed by improving the choice architecture.

==== Retirement saving ====
Thaler and Sunstein point out that many Americans are not saving enough for retirement. They state that "in 2005 the personal savings rate for Americans was negative for the first time since 1932 and 1933 – the Great Depression years".

One change they offer is creating better default plans for employees. Employees would be able to adopt any plan they like, but, if no action is taken, they would automatically be enrolled in an expertly designed program [such as social security]. They also propose what they refer to as the "Save More Tomorrow" plan. This is to address the issue of people having the desire to save more, yet procrastinating on actually doing so. This program would invite "participants to commit themselves, in advance, to a series of contribution increases timed to coincide with pay raises".

==== Health care ====
The book contains an analysis of the Bush administration program Medicare Part D. Thaler and Sunstein state that "on some dimensions, Bush was on the right track" with the plan, but that, "as a piece of choice architecture...it suffered from a cumbersome design that impeded good decision making". Specifically, they think that default choices for programs should not have been random and that beneficiaries of the program were not given adequate resources to deal with the number of choices they were faced with. They think that seniors who did not sign up for a program should have one assigned to them, and that, yearly, they should be mailed an itemized list of all drugs they had used and all of the fees they incurred. This information would be freely available online so beneficiaries could easily compare their programs with other similar ones.

Sunstein and Thaler also propose a way to increase organ donation rates in the United States. They argue that a mandated choice program should be put in place, where, in order for someone to renew their driver's license, they must say whether or not they would like to be an organ donor. They also advocate the creation of websites which would suggest that the wider community supports organ donation in order to nudge people into becoming organ donors themselves.

== Origins ==
Thaler came up with the term "libertarian paternalism" in a discussion with Casey B. Mulligan and then continued to discuss the term during a weekly lunch with Cass Sunstein. In 2003, Thaler and Sunstein cowrote articles on the topic for the American Economic Review and the University of Chicago Law Review.

Thaler's name appears first because the book is based mostly on his research, and the authors decided that every chapter would be written in Thaler's voice. The money was split evenly between the two authors.

Thaler wanted the subtitle to be The Gentle Power of Choice Architecture.

== Reception ==
George Will's review for Newsweek magazine stated that "nudges have the additional virtue of annoying those busybody, nanny-state liberals who, as the saying goes, do not care what people do as long as it is compulsory".

British journalist Bryan Appleyard, in a review for The Times, was critical of the book, describing it as a "very, very dull read, a dogged march through social policies with boring lists of what nudges should be imposed and how" and that "what the book needs is not more examples but more elaboration of the central idea".

Christopher Shea wrote for The Washington Post that "In the end, it must be said, the profusion of proposals in Nudge, however worthy, and the countless summaries of studies supporting them grow a bit wearisome. As influential as the book is likely to be, it's hard to imagine it pushing its way alongside Malcolm Gladwell's Blink (inferior social science, far breezier style) on the bestseller list".

Elizabeth Kolbert writing for The New Yorker held reservations about some of the book's conclusions when she wrote that

many of the suggestions in Nudge seem like good ideas, and even, as with “Save More Tomorrow,” practical ones. The whole project, though, as Thaler and Sunstein acknowledge, raises some pretty awkward questions. If the “nudgee” can’t be depended on to recognize his own best interests, why stop at a nudge? Why not offer a “push,” or perhaps even a “shove”? And if people can’t be trusted to make the right choices for themselves how can they possibly be trusted to make the right decisions for the rest of us?

In July 2011, a subgroup of the UK House of Lords Science and Technology Committee concluded a year-long review of behavioral change based on 148 written submissions and evidence from 70 witnesses. The review was led by Baroness Neuberger. In an interview with The Guardian newspaper, Baroness Neuberger reports finding "precious little" evidence for effective impact of Nudge:

You need more than just nudge ... Behavioural change interventions appear to work best when they're part of a package of regulation and fiscal measures ... all politicians love quick fixes ... one of the problems with all of this is if you really want to change people's behaviour it takes a very long time ... you have to look at a 20- to 25-year span before you get a full change of behaviour.

American law professor Pierre Schlag notes that, for all their attention to framing issues, Sunstein and Thaler neglect a number of important questions: "(1) What to optimize? (2) When is a nudge a shove? (3) Should we prefer experts? and (4) When do we nudge?"

Gerd Gigerenzer, a psychologist, in his 2015 article "On the Supposed Evidence for Libertarian Paternalism," wrote, "Since the publication of Thaler and Sunstein's (2008) Nudge, almost everything that affects behavior has been renamed a nudge, which renders this concept meaningless."

== See also ==
- Behavioural Insights Team
- Nudge theory
- Sludge theory
