= Default effect =

Tendency to accept the default option

The default effect, a concept within the study of nudge theory, explains the tendency for an agent to generally accept the default option in a strategic interaction. The default option is the course of action that the agent, or chooser, will obtain if he or she does not specify a particular course of action. The default effect has broad applications for firms attempting to "nudge" their customers in the direction of the firm's optimal outcome. Experiments and observational studies show that making an option a default increases the likelihood that such an option is chosen. There are two broad classes of defaults: mass defaults and personalised defaults. Setting or changing defaults has been proposed and applied by firms as an effective way of influencing behaviour—for example, with respect to setting air-conditioner temperature settings, giving consent to receive e-mail marketing, or automatic subscription renewals.

== Default effect ==
=== Endogenous default effects ===
In a choice context, a default refers to that option which choosers end up with if they do not make an active choice. This notion is similar to the one in computer science where defaults are settings or values that are automatically assigned outside of user intervention. Setting the default affects how likely people end up with an option. This is called the default effect. More precisely, it refers to changes in the probability that an agent chooses a particular option when it is set as a default as opposed to the situation where this option has not been set as a default. For example, different countries have different rules on how to become an organ donor. In countries with the opt-in policy, all citizens are automatically considered as non-donors unless they actively register as donors. In countries with the opt-out policy, all citizens are automatically considered as donors unless they actively seek to be struck from the register. It has been argued that this difference in policy is the main cause of the significant difference in donor rates across the respective countries.

=== Exogenous default effects ===
Some default effects are implied by the situation. In social settings, for example, the normative choice (what others are doing) may be adopted unconsciously as a social default effect. People are thus more likely to choose what they observe other choosing, even if they do not believe that the other person is the more knowledgeable person. People are also more likely to treat choices that require less justification as defaults. The default option for parole hearings, for example, is to deny prisoners parole.

== Types of default options in behavioral economics ==
Mass defaults	Personalised defaults
Benign defaults	Smart defaults
Random defaults	Persistent defaults
Hidden options	Adaptive defaults

=== Mass defaults ===
Mass defaults are those which apply to all consumers of a product or service and do not take into account each individual consumer's preferences or characteristics. Mass defaults are useful when a firm cannot, or does not want to, invest time and financial means into allocating separate default options to each customer based on their individual profile and preferences. By their nature, mass defaults may fail to give some customers their first choice; however, in general, a mass default strategy can be useful to a firm if the majority of customers choose the default option.

==== Benign defaults ====
Representing a company's "best guess" about what customers want and therefore what to set as the default option.

==== Random defaults ====
This is where defaults are arbitrarily assigned to customers. This strategy occurs when a firm lacks understanding of the majority preferences, and none of the options would cause harm to the firm.

==== Hidden options ====
Firms can present the default as the only choice, when in fact, there are other "hidden" options available. An example of this is the default ringtone on a phone; some consumers may be oblivious to the fact that there is a plethora of other ringtones available other than the system-default.

=== Personalised defaults ===
Personalised defaults are those where the firm tailors the default option to meet each individual customer's preferences or characteristics. This requires the firm to have data on each customer (customer segment) that can be used without breaching privacy policy concerns. Potential characteristics that may be observed are demographics, past choices and real-time decisions that a customer makes.

==== Smart defaults ====
Smart defaults use individual customer information such as demographics and other profiles to personalise a default option that maximises utility for both the firm and the consumer.

==== Persistent defaults ====
Persistent defaults are generated by using data from individual consumers' past purchases and preferences to allocate a personalised default option to each customer. The notion behind the persistent default is that a customer's future choice is best predicted by viewing their past preferences.

==== Adaptive defaults ====
Adaptive defaults update the profile of each customer based on live decisions that the individual makes. This process is utilized when there is a lack of prior data regarding the customers' preferences and demographic information.

== Explanations ==
A number of different explanations have been offered for how default settings cause a change in the choice distribution.

=== Cognitive effort ===
If an agent is indifferent or conflicted between options, it may involve too much cognitive effort to base a choice on explicit evaluations. In that case, he or she might disregard the evaluations and choose according to the default heuristic instead, which simply states "if there is a default, do nothing about it". Evidence supporting this cognitive effort account is provided in the realm of social default effects. Participants distracted by a demanding concurrent task were more likely to choose one of two snacks that they saw a previous participant choose. Increasing the number of snacks received as a function of the choice decreased this social default effect.

=== Switching costs ===
If an agent faces costs when diverging from a default that surmount the possible benefits from switching to another option, then it is rational to stick with the default option. Costs of diverging from the default might involve costs for the search of information (time, consultancy fees) and/or costs for registering the choice (time, postage, lawyer fees). This amounts to a standard transaction cost explanation from rational choice theory.

=== Loss aversion ===
If an agent evaluates options on multiple dimensions, then the default functions as a reference point from which some dimensions are interpreted as losses and therefore becomes more important for the choice. This loss aversion explanation of the default effect can be illustrated with the following example. Let A, B and C be three different pension saving plans. The agent evaluates them (in terms of time-discounted utilities) on the two following dimensions: current consumption and future savings which obviously trade off: the more one saves for the future, the less one can consume in the present.

	A	B	C
Consumption	10	20	30
Savings	30	20	10

Seen from plan A being the default, plans B and C constitute losses in the savings dimension. Seen from plan C being the default, however, plans A and B constitute losses in the consumption dimension. According to the theory of loss aversion, that dimension which is considered a loss influences the decision more strongly than that which is considered a gain. Hence for either default A or C, the loss-averse agent would choose to stick with the default.

=== Recommendation ===
If an agent interprets the default as a signal from the policymaker, whom he or she sufficiently trusts, he or she might rationally decide to stick with this default. That the policy maker sets a default is interpreted as an implicit recommendation to choose that default option. The information taken from this recommendation might be sufficient to change some people's preferences.

=== Change of meaning ===
Defaults also might affect the meaning of choice options and thus agents' choices over them. For example, it has been shown that under an opt-in policy in organ donation choosing not to become an organ donor is perceived as a choice of little moral failing. Under an opt-out policy, in contrast, choosing not to be an organ donor is perceived as morally more deficient. Alternatively, families may perceive those choosing to be an organ donor under an opt-out system as less committed than those in an opt-in system, and so refuse to allow their relative's organs to be harvested. These differences in evaluation might affect the rational choice over these options.

== Default setting as a policy instrument ==
Setting or changing defaults has been proposed as an effective way of influencing behaviour—for example, with respect to deciding whether to become an organ donor, giving consent to receive e-mail marketing, choosing car insurance plans, choosing which food to eat, selecting which car options to purchase, choosing between different energy providers, or choosing the level of one's retirement contributions. Setting defaults are an important example of nudges or soft paternalist policies.

== See also ==
- Affordance
- Convention over configuration – software design paradigm concerned with "sensible defaults"
