= Nudge theory =

Concept in behavioral economics, political theory and behavioral sciences

Nudge theory is a concept in behavioral economics, decision making, behavioral policy, social psychology, consumer behavior, and related behavioral sciences that proposes adaptive designs of the decision environment (choice architecture) as ways to influence the behavior and decision-making of groups or individuals. Nudging contrasts with other ways to achieve compliance, such as education, legislation or enforcement.

The nudge concept was popularized in the 2008 book Nudge: Improving Decisions About Health, Wealth, and Happiness, by behavioral economist Richard Thaler and legal scholar Cass Sunstein, two American scholars at the University of Chicago. It has influenced British and American politicians. Several nudge units exist around the world at the national level (UK, Germany, Japan, and others) as well as at the international level (e.g. World Bank, UN, and the European Commission). There is ongoing debate over whether "nudge theory" is a recent novel development in behavioral economics or merely a new term for one of many methods for influencing behavior.

The effectiveness of nudges is controversial. Maier et al. wrote that, after correcting the publication bias found by Mertens et al. (2021), there is no evidence that nudging has any effect.

"Nudging" is an umbrella term referring to many techniques. Skeptics believe some nudges (e.g. default effect) can be highly effective while others have little to no effect. They call for studies that focus on moderators and shift away from investigating average effects. A meta-analysis of all unpublished nudging studies carried by nudge units with over 23 million individuals in the United Kingdom and United States found effectiveness in some nudges, but with substantially weaker effects than published studies indicate. Moreover, some researchers criticized the "one-nudge-for-all" approach and advocated for more studies, with a more robust and consistent evidence base. Implementations of personalized nudging (based on individual differences) appear to be more effective.

== Nudges ==
=== Definition ===
The first formulation of the term nudge and associated principles was developed in cybernetics by James Wilk before 1995 and described by Brunel University academic D. J. Stewart as "the art of the nudge" (sometimes referred to as micronudges). It also drew on methodological influences from clinical psychotherapy tracing back to Gregory Bateson, including contributions from Milton Erickson, Watzlawick, Weakland and Fisch, and Bill O'Hanlon. In this variant, a nudge is a microtargeted design geared toward a specific group of people, irrespective of the scale of intended intervention.

In 2008, Richard Thaler and Cass Sunstein's book Nudge: Improving Decisions About Health, Wealth, and Happiness brought nudge theory to prominence. The authors refer to the influencing of behaviour without coercion as libertarian paternalism and the influencers as choice architects.

Thaler and Sunstein defined their concept as the following:

A nudge, as we will use the term, is any aspect of the choice architecture that alters people's behavior in a predictable way without forbidding any options or significantly changing their economic incentives. To count as a mere nudge, the intervention must be easy and cheap to avoid. Nudges are not mandates. Putting fruit at eye level counts as a nudge. Banning junk food does not.

In this form, drawing on behavioral economics, the nudge is more generally applied in order to influence behaviour.

The book gained a following among US and UK politicians, as well as in the private sector and in public health.

=== Overview ===
A nudge attempts to make it more likely that an individual will make a particular choice, or behave in a particular way, by altering the environment so that automatic cognitive processes are triggered to favour the desired outcome.

An individual's behaviour is not always in alignment with their intentions (a discrepancy known as a value-action gap). It is common knowledge that humans are not fully rational beings; that is, people will often do something that is not in their own self-interest, even when they are aware that their actions are not in their best interest. As an example, when hungry, people who diet often underestimate their ability to lose weight, and their intentions to eat healthy can be temporarily weakened until they are satiated.

Nobel Laureate Daniel Kahneman describes two distinct systems for processing information as to why people sometimes act against their own self-interest: System 1 is fast, automatic, and highly susceptible to environmental influences; System 2 processing is slow, reflective, and takes into account explicit goals and intentions. When situations are overly complex or overwhelming for an individual's cognitive capacity, or when an individual is faced with time-constraints or other pressures, System 1 processing takes over decision-making. System 1 processing relies on various judgmental heuristics to make decisions, resulting in faster decisions. Unfortunately, this can also lead to suboptimal decisions. In fact, Thaler and Sunstein trace maladaptive behaviour to situations in which System 1 processing overrides an individual's explicit values and goals. It is well documented that habitual behaviour is resistant to change without a disruption to the environmental cues that trigger that behaviour.

Nudging techniques aim to use judgmental heuristics to the advantage of the party that is creating the set of choices. In other words, a nudge alters the environment so that when heuristic, or System 1, decision-making is used, the resulting choice will be the most positive or desired outcome. An example of such a nudge is switching the placement of junk food in a store, so that fruit and other healthy options are located next to the cash register, while junk food is relocated to another part of the store.

=== Techniques ===
Nudges are small changes in the environment that are easy and inexpensive to implement. In head-to-head comparisons, randomized experiments have found that nudges can sometimes motivate behavior change more effectively than paying people. Several different techniques exist for nudging, including defaults, social-proof heuristics, and increasing the salience of the desired option.

A default option is the option that a person automatically receives for doing nothing. People are more likely to choose a particular option if it is the default option. For example, Pichert and Katsikopoulos (2008) found that a greater number of consumers chose the renewable energy option for electricity when it was offered as the default option. Similarly, the default options given to mobile apps developers in advertising networks can significantly impact consumers' privacy.

A social-proof heuristic refers to the tendency of people to look at the behavior of others to help guide their own behavior. Studies have found some success in using social-proof heuristics to nudge people to make healthier food choices.

When people's attention is drawn toward a particular option, that option will become more salient and they will be more likely to choose it. As an example, in snack shops at train stations in the Netherlands, consumers purchased more fruit and healthy snack options when they were relocated next to the cash register. Since then, other similar studies have been made regarding the placement of healthier food options close to the checkout counter and the effect on the consuming behavior of the customers, and this is now considered an effective and well-accepted nudge.

== Application ==
Behavioral insights and nudges are currently used in many countries around the world.

=== Government ===
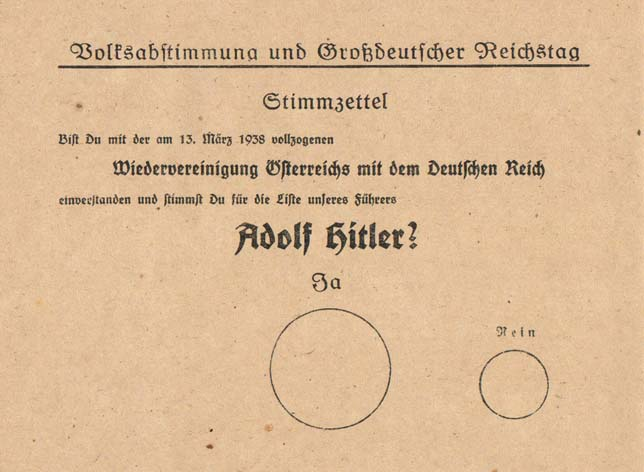
In the 1938 Austrian Anschluss referendum, the larger centered circle was "a 'subtle' hint to the people, to help them understand which way to vote." The intended result, a Ja ("yes") to the annexation of Austria into Germany with Hitler as its leader, was finally achieved through this and other blunter measures.

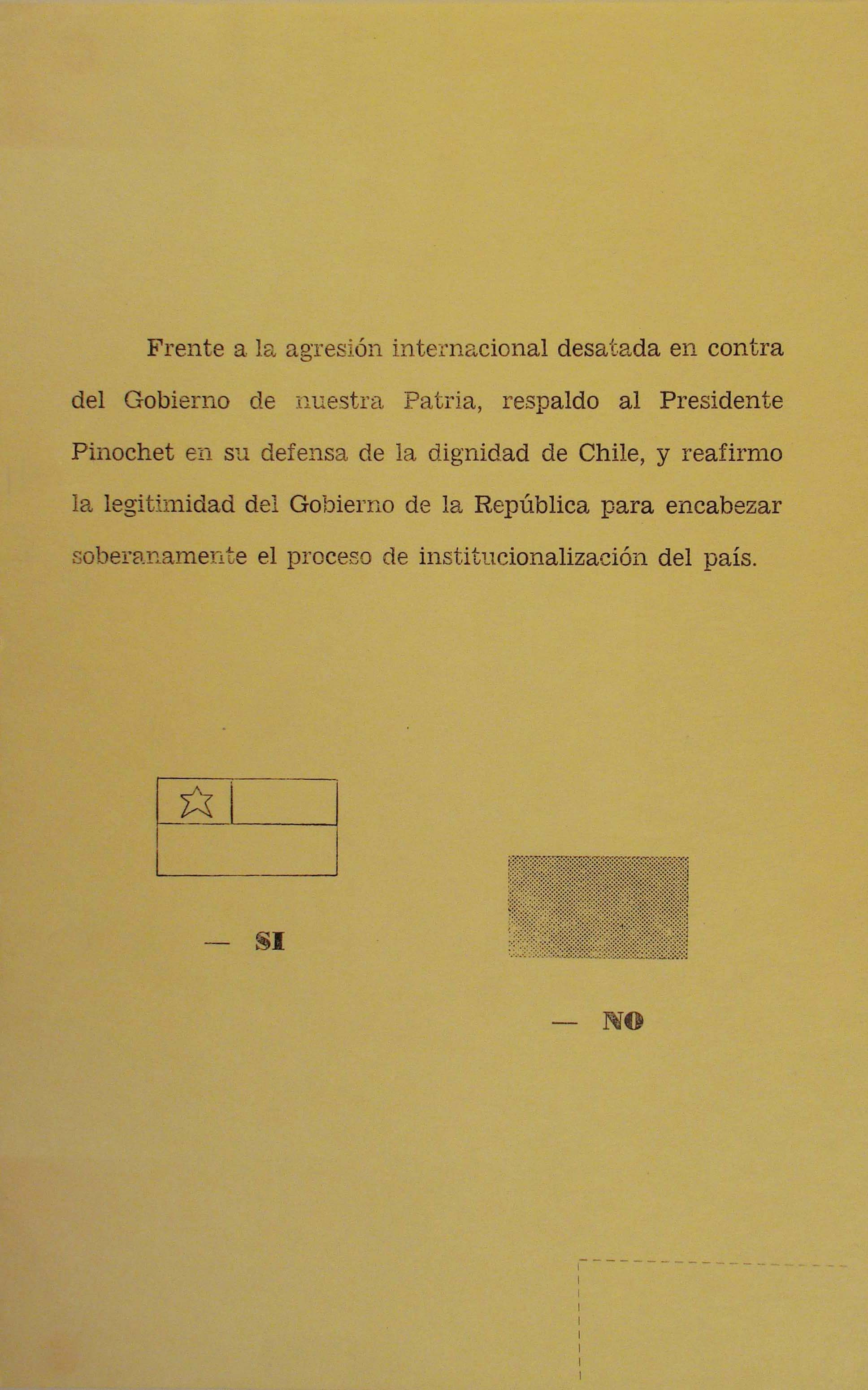
In the 1978 Chilean national consultation, in addition to the biased question text, the SI ("Yes" to Pinochet and his government) is under a sketch of the flag of Chile while NO is under a lower dark flag. This nudge and other measures got a 79% support for "yes".

There are various notable examples of government applications of nudge theory.

During their terms, both U.K. Prime Minister David Cameron and U.S. President Barack Obama may have sought to employ nudge theory to advance domestic policy goals in their respective countries. In 2009, Cass Sunstein, who helped develop the theory, was appointed as administrator of the Office of Information and Regulatory Affairs. In 2010, the British Behavioural Insights Team, or "Nudge Unit," was established at the British Cabinet Office and headed by psychologist David Halpern.

In Australia, the state Government of New South Wales established a Nudge Unit of its own in 2012. In 2016, the federal government followed suit, forming the Behavioural Economics Team of Australia (BETA) as the "central unit for applying behavioural insights...to public policy."

In 2016, Canada decided to copy the British Behavioural Insights Team, creating the Innovation Hub within the Privy Council (i.e. within the Prime Minister's office), and later changed the name to the Impact and Innovation Unit. During the covid crisis, the IIU played a major role in convincing people to behave according to government dictates. "Tasked to advise the Public Health Agency of Canada on securing vaccination compliance, the IIU applied behavioural-science research and extensive message-testing to craft a national communications strategy, according to the Justice Centre for Constitutional Freedoms."

In 2020, the British government of Boris Johnson decided to rely on nudge theory to fight the coronavirus pandemic, with Chief Scientific Adviser Patrick Vallance seeking to encourage "herd immunity" with this strategy.

=== Business ===
Nudge theory has also been applied to business management and corporate culture.

For instance, nudge is applied to health, safety, and environment (HSE) with the primary goals of achieving a "zero accident culture." The concept is also used as a key component in a lot of human-resources software.

Particular forerunners in the application of nudge theory in corporate settings are top Silicon Valley companies. These companies are using nudges in various forms to increase productivity and happiness of employees. Recently, more companies are gaining interest in using what is called "nudge management" to improve the productivity of their white-collar workers.

=== Healthcare ===
Nudge theory has also been used in different ways in healthcare. For example, researchers have tested different nudges to encourage people to get vaccinated. People have also used nudges to help healthcare professionals make more deliberate decisions, such as improving hand hygiene among healthcare workers to decrease the number of healthcare-associated infections. It has also been used as a way to make fluid administration a more thought-out decision in intensive care units, with the intention of reducing well-known complications of fluid overload.

Mandatory display of inspector reports of eatery hygiene as a public 'nudge', have received mixed responses in different countries. A recent meta-analytic review of the hygiene ratings across North America, Europe, Asia, and Oceania has shown that inspector ratings (usually a smiley or a letter grade) is useful at times, but not informative enough for consumers.

=== Fundraising ===
Nudge theory can also be applied to fundraising, helping to increase donor contributions and increase continuous donations from the same individual, as well as to entice new donors to give.

There are some simple strategies used when applying nudge theory to this area. The first strategy is to make donating easy: creating default settings that automatically enroll a donor for continuous giving or prompts them to give every so often encourages individuals to continue giving. The second strategy to increase donors is to make giving more enticing, which can include increasing a person's motivation to give through rewards, personalized messages, or focusing on their interests. Personalized messages, small thank-you gifts, and demonstrating the impact one's donation can have on others, have been shown to be more effective when increasing donations. Another strategy helpful to increasing donors is using social influence, as people are very influenced by group norms. By allowing donors to become visible to the public and increasing their identifiability, other individuals will be more inclined to give as they conform to the social norms around them. Using peer effects has been shown to increase donations. Finally, timing is important: many studies have demonstrated that there are specific times when individuals are more likely to give, for example during holidays.

Although many nudging theories have been useful to increase donations and donors, many scholars question the ethics of using such techniques on the population. Ruehle et al. (2020), state that one has to always consider an individual's autonomy when designing nudges for a fundraising campaign. They state that the power of others behind messaging and potentially intrusive prompting can cause concern and may be seen as manipulative of donor's autonomy.

=== Artificial intelligence ===
Nudges are used at many levels in AI algorithms, for example recommender systems, and their consequences are still being investigated. Two articles appeared in Minds & Machines in 2018 addressed the relation between nudges and Artificial Intelligence, explaining how persuasion and psychometrics can be used by personalised targeting algorithms to influence individual and collective behaviour, sometimes also in unintended ways. In 2020 an article in AI & Society addressed the use of this technology in Algorithmic Regulation.

A piece in the Harvard Business Review published in 2021 was one of the first articles to coin the term "Algorithmic Nudging" (see also Algorithmic Management). The author stresses "Companies are increasingly using algorithms to manage and control individuals not by force, but rather by nudging them into desirable behavior — in other words, learning from their personalized data and altering their choices in some subtle way."

While the concept builds on the work by University of Chicago economist Richard Thaler and Harvard Law School professor Cass Sunstein, "due to recent advances in AI and machine learning, algorithmic nudging is much more powerful than its non-algorithmic counterpart. With so much data about workers' behavioral patterns at their fingertips, companies can now develop personalized strategies for changing individuals' decisions and behaviors at large scale. These algorithms can be adjusted in real-time, making the approach even more effective."

=== Tourism ===
One concern researchers in enjoyment-focused contexts, such as tourism, raised is a gap between attitude, intention and behaviour because tourists seek pleasure. Several empirical pieces of evidence in the tourism suggest the nudge theory's high effectiveness in reducing the burden of tourists' activities on the environment. For instance, tourists consumed more ethical foods, selected more sustainable hotels, reused towels and bed linen during hotel stays, increased their intentions to reduce their energy consumption, increased the adoption of tourists' voluntary carbon offsetting and many other examples.

=== Education ===
Nudges in education are techniques used to subtly guide students towards making better choices and achieving their academic goals. These nudges are based on the principles of behavioral economics and psychology, particularly the concept of dual process theory. This theory suggests that there are two systems of thinking: System 1, which is automatic and instinctual, and System 2, which is reflective and deliberate. Nudges aim to influence behavior by targeting System 1 processes, such as habits and automatic responses, to help students overcome common obstacles like procrastination, lack of motivation, or poor study habits. By designing nudges that align with students' goals and cognitive processes, educators can effectively support students in reaching their full potential and improving their academic performance.

==== Nudging in Education: Promises and Challenges ====
Similar to nudging in other areas, nudging in education aims to help individuals achieve desired behaviors they may struggle with due to habits or lack of motivation. For students, this could mean meeting deadlines, paying attention in class, or staying organized. Some promising examples include sending text reminders to parents to increase home literary activities and providing information about famous scientists' struggles to improve student grades. However, challenges remain. It's unclear if nudges lead to long-lasting changes or how they work over time once removed. Additionally, it's essential to ensure that nudges align with educational principles and have a positive impact on students. More research is needed to understand how nudges influence behavior and cognitive processes in education effectively.

While nudging shows potential in education, questions remain about its long-term effectiveness and how it fits within educational principles. Nudges should not only focus on end goals but also consider the cognitive processes and behaviors they influence. By understanding these aspects, educators can ensure that nudges promote positive educational practices and help students develop lasting habits. However, the implementation of nudging in education remains limited, highlighting the need for further exploration and development in this area

==== Behavior economics concepts commonly use in education ====
Cognitive depletion	When a person has to make difficult or complex choices
Cognitive overload	Being challenging for a person to make rational choices because of the complexity of the choice
Framing	Framing refers to how the same option can be presented differently (positive vs. negative) to influence decisions. Positive framing or negative framing can both nudge behavior, depending on context and goal.
Loss aversion	A phenomenon when people dislike losing to a greater extent than the happiness they get when winning. Behavioral economists can use this aversion to loss to nudge people to behavior changes.
Narrow bracketing	Describes the process that people use to make complicated decisions by breaking them into smaller decisions. Sometimes this strategy leads people to make inaccurate decisions
Salience	describes how a person is more likely to make a choice about something that has been more visible as a choice or more salient while ignoring other choices that were less visible
Time-inconsistency	describes how people make choices that are different based on when they are asked to make the choice. For example, a person might make a different choice when they are very tired at the end of a long day than a choice made at the beginning of the day
Default Options	are commonly used in behavioral economics nudges default options. The default option occurs if no choice or action is taken

== Critique ==
The evidence on nudging having any effect has been criticized as "limited," so Mertens and colleagues (2021) produced a comprehensive meta-analysis. They found that nudging is effective but there is a moderate publication bias. Later, Maier and colleagues found that, after correcting for this publication bias appropriately, there is no evidence that nudging would have any effect.

Tammy Boyce, from the public health foundation The King's Fund, has said: "We need to move away from short-term, politically motivated initiatives such as the 'nudging people' idea, which are not based on any good evidence and don't help people make long-term behaviour changes." Likewise, Mols and colleagues (2015), acknowledge nudges may at times be useful but argue that covert nudges offer limited scope for securing lasting behavior change.

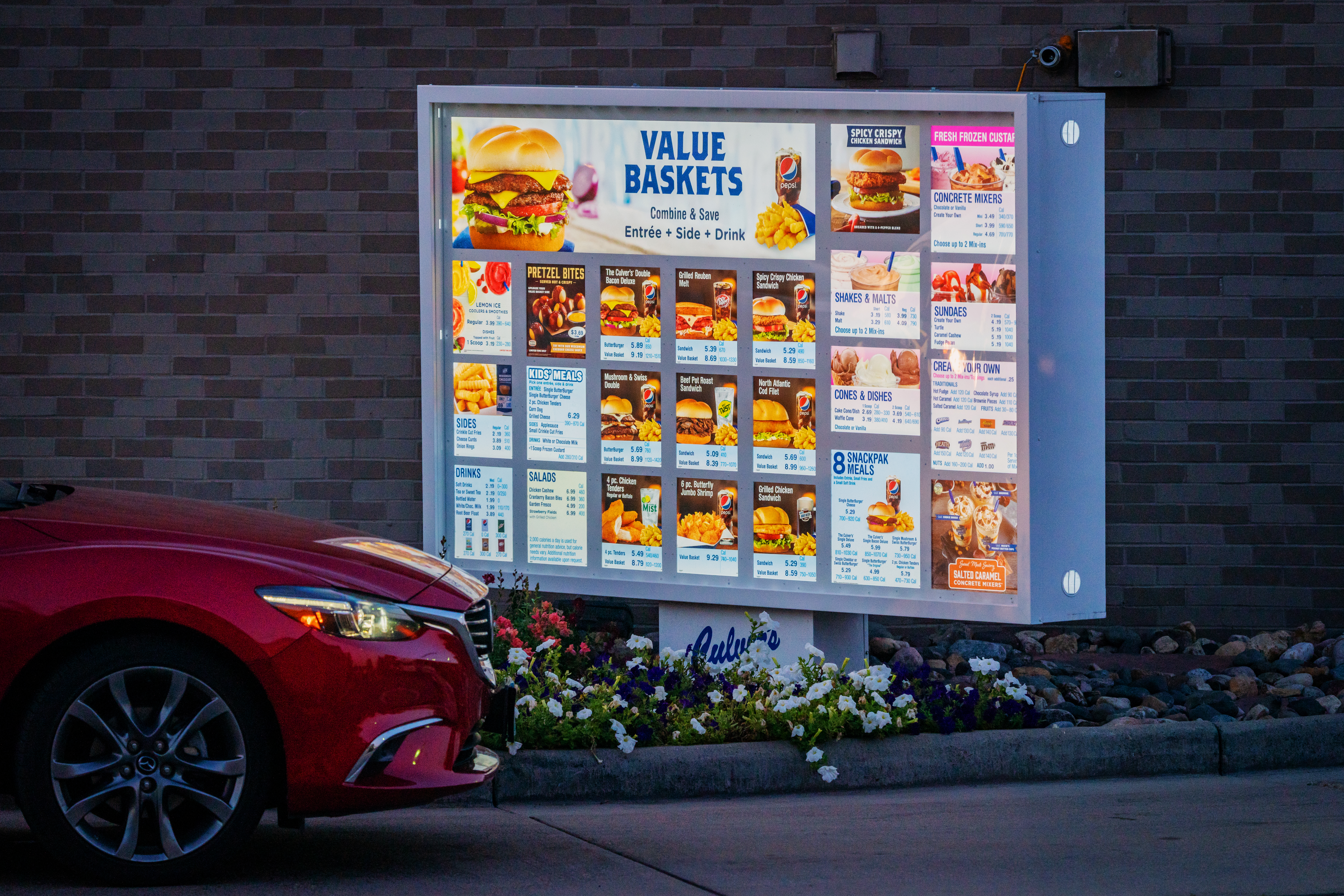
A "Drive-Thru" menu at Culver's. Drive throughs are criticized for featuring "dark nudges", influencing customers to make big purchases.

Cass Sunstein has responded to criticism at length in his 2016 book, The Ethics of Influence: Government in the Age of Behavioral Science, making the case in favor of nudging, against charges that nudges diminish autonomy, threaten dignity, violate liberties, or reduce welfare. He previously defended nudge theory in his 2014 book Why Nudge?: The Politics of Libertarian Paternalism by arguing that choice architecture is inevitable and that some form of paternalism cannot be avoided.

Ethicists have debated nudge theory rigorously. These charges have been made by various participants in the debate from Bovens (2009) to Goodwin (2012).Julian Friedland et al. (2023) caution that heavy reliance on nudges can undermine personal agency over the long term, offering an alternative intervention model based on cognitive boosting and moral self-awareness, while others such as Yeung (2012) question their scientific credibility.

Public opinion on the ethicality of nudges has also been shown to be susceptible to "partisan nudge bias." Research from David Tannenbaum, Craig R. Fox, and Todd Rogers (2017) found that adults and policymakers in the United States believed behavioral policies to be more ethical when they aligned with their own political leanings. Conversely, people took these same mechanisms to be more unethical when they differed from their politics. The researchers also found that nudges are not inherently partisan: when evaluating behavioral policies absent of political cues, people across the political spectrum were alike in their assessments.

When considering the future designers that would be creating these nudges, a study by Willermark and Islind (2022) showed that more than 50% of design students have positive attitudes towards the implementation of nudges as a form of choice architecture. The participants argued that "many people benefit from getting a little nudge", while about 40% have ambivalent or negative attitudes towards the concept stating that "We simply should not change the path of people's choices".

Some, such as Hausman and Welch (2010) as well as Roberts (2018) and Mrkva (2021) have inquired whether nudging should be permissible on grounds of distributive justice. Though Roberts (2018) argued that nudges do not benefit vulnerable, low-income individuals as much as individuals who are less vulnerable, Mrkva's research suggests that nudges benefit low-income and low-SES people most, if anything increasing distributive justice and reducing the disparity between those with high and low financial literacy. This research suggests that in situations where consumers lack knowledge regarding their choices and are therefore more prone to choosing the wrong one, the implementation of 'good nudges' can be ethically justified. The same study also states that nudges have the potential to "increase firm profits while decreasing consumer welfare."

Lepenies and Malecka (2015) have questioned whether nudges are compatible with the rule of law. Similarly, legal scholars have discussed the role of nudges and the law.

Behavioral economists such as Bob Sugden have pointed out that the underlying normative benchmark of nudging is still homo economicus, despite the proponents' claim to the contrary.

It has been remarked that nudging is also a euphemism for psychological manipulation as practiced in social engineering.

There exists an anticipation and, simultaneously, implicit criticism of the nudge theory in works of Hungarian social psychologists Ferenc Mérei and László Garai, who emphasize the active participation in the nudge of its target.

The authors of a book titled Neuroliberalism: Behavioural Government in the Twenty-First Century (2017), argue that, while there is much value and diversity in behavioural approaches to government, there are significant ethical issues, including the danger of the neurological sciences being co-opted to the needs of neo-liberal economics.

== See also ==
- Choice architecture
- Commitment device
- Constructal Law - Design evolution in nature, animate and inanimate
- Dark pattern
- Default effect
- Libertarian paternalism
- List of cognitive biases
- Negarchy
- Psychohistory (fictional)
- Thinking, Fast and Slow
- Race to the Top
- Propaganda
