= Echoborg =

Person whose words or actions are determined by artificial intelligence

An echoborg is a person whose words and actions are determined, in whole or in part, by an artificial intelligence (AI).

The term echoborg was coined in 2014 by social psychologists Kevin Corti and Alex Gillespie, whose research at the London School of Economics explored unscripted face-to-face social encounters between research participants and confederates whose words were covertly supplied by Cleverbot and spoken with a delay via speech shadowing. The idea is derivative of the cyranoid concept that originated with Stanley Milgram.

The echoborg method can show how people behave and make attributions toward an AI (or more precisely, a human-AI hybrid) when their psychological state is fully primed for human–human interaction. Corti and Gillespie argue that other forms of human–AI interaction (e.g., computer-mediated conversation) involve a machine interface, anthropomorphic analog, or a virtual reality layer through which a person communicates with an AI, and that these forms of mediation fundamentally alter the intersubjective relationship between the human and artificial agents party to an interaction.

The echoborg concept has been explored in performance art as commentary on the increasing ubiquity of AI and its contribution to human culture, as well as people's dependency on various types of machine-human interactions (e.g., GPS navigation systems) for carrying out mundane social tasks.

== See also ==
- Wizard of Oz experiment
- Turing test
- Chatbot
- Cyborg
- Clanker
- ELIZA effect
