= Cyranoid =

Thoughts spoken by someone other than their originator

In social psychology research, a cyranoid is a person whose speech is controlled by covert radio transmissions originating from another. The concept was developed by psychologist Stanley Milgram as a research method, and he conducted experiments where teachers interviewed 11- and 12-year old children while unaware that their responses were being prompted by Milgram over a radio connection.

The concept is named after the French writer Cyrano de Bergerac, as it was based on a fictionalized depiction of Cyrano in the theatrical play Cyrano de Bergerac by Edmond Rostand.

== Background ==
The cyranoid concept originated in the late 1970s with psychologist Stanley Milgram, who developed the idea as a means of operationalizing the mind–body fusion fantasy explored in Edmond Rostand's 1897 play Cyrano de Bergerac. In the story, the eponymous writer Cyrano de Bergerac (a romantic but unattractive poet) supplies Christian (a handsome but inarticulate cadet) with amorous prose so that they may jointly woo Roxane (each being incapable, given their respective limitations, of doing so on their own).

Milgram differentiated the various components of a cyranic interaction: The "shadower" receives words supplied by a "source" by-way-of covert audio relay (e.g., discreet radio transmission) and immediately replicates these words using an audio-vocal technique known as speech shadowing. The "interactant", meanwhile, dialogues face-to-face with the shadower. If successful, the nature of the interaction gives rise to a phenomenon Milgram referred to as the "cyranic illusion", whereby the interactant fails to detect that their interlocutor is merely a speech shadower repeating the words of a remote source.

In his original pilot studies, Milgram explored a variety of cyranic interactions, including a scenario in which panels of teachers interviewed who they believed were autonomously communicating 11- and 12-year-old children, when in reality Milgram, acting as a source, provided the children with what to say. None of the teachers suspected their interviewees were in fact being controlled by another individual, despite the highly sophisticated responses they seemingly produced. Another scenario included multiple sources controlling a single shadower.

Following these studies, Milgram concluded that the cyranoid method held promise as a social psychological research tool, as it allows one to separate the form of a social actor (their physical nature) from the content (words) they produce in interactive social settings. Among other things, therefore, the cyranoid method serves as a means of exploring phenomena such as racial, gender, and age-based stereotyping, as one can dynamically test how a single source is perceived and interacted with differently on the basis of their communicating through a variety of physically differentiated source-types.

Though initially ignored, researchers have recently begun re-exploring the cyranoid concept in scientific settings. In 2014, Kevin Corti and Alex Gillespie, social psychologists at the London School of Economics, published the first replications of Milgram's original pilots (Milgram himself never formally published his work with the technique). Robb Mitchell has explored cyranoids as an experiential learning tool within the classroom (having children shadow for teachers during teaching exercises). Cyranoids have also been used in installation art to explore social experiences whereby people encounter those familiar to them through the bodies of strangers.

More recently, the cyranoid method has been extended to study how humans interact with artificial agents such as chat bots. A speech shadower who speaks the words of an artificial agent is called an echoborg. When people interact with a covert echoborg they tend to engage in more intersubjective effort. The cyranoid and echoborg methods can be used to mix and match bodies and cognition sources opening up a broad range of research questions.

== See also ==
- Milgram experiment
- Non-player character
