= Obedience to Authority: An Experimental View =

1974 book by Stanley Milgram

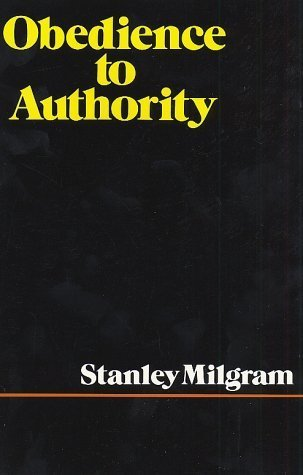
- First edition cover
- Author: Stanley Milgram
- Language: English
- Subject: Psychology, Social Psychology, Sociology - Social Theory, Authority, Obedience
- Publisher: Harper & Row
- Publication date: 1974
- Publication place: United States
- Media type: Print (Hardback and Paperback)
- Pages: 219
- ISBN: 0-422-74580-4

Obedience to Authority: An Experimental View is a 1974 book by social psychologist Stanley Milgram concerning a series of experiments on obedience to authority figures he conducted in the early 1960s. This book provides an in-depth look into his methods, theories and conclusions.

== Background ==
Between 1961 and 1965, Milgram carried out a series of experiments at Yale University in which subjects were instructed to administer what they thought were progressively more painful electric shocks to another human, to determine to what extent people would obey orders even when they knew them to be painful and immoral. The experiments came under heavy criticism at the time, but were ultimately vindicated by the scientific community.

In 1963, Milgram published The Behavioral Study of Obedience in the Journal of Abnormal and Social Psychology, which included a detailed record of the experiment. The record emphasized the tension the experiment brought to its participants, but also the extreme strength of the subjects' obedience: all participants had given electric shocks of 300 volts or more.

== Result ==
Stanley Milgram's obedience experiments demonstrated that ordinary individuals are willing to administer severe electric shocks to an innocent person when instructed by an authority figure. In the baseline condition, 65% of participants continued to the maximum 450-volt shock. However, obedience dropped significantly when the authority figure was not physically present, when the learner was in close proximity, or when another participant (a confederate) refused to continue. These variations highlight the role of situational factors, rather than personality traits, in driving harmful obedience.

== Editions ==
1. Milgram, S. (1974), Obedience to Authority: An Experimental View, London: Tavistock Publications.
2. Milgram, S. (2005), Obedience to Authority: An Experimental View, Pinter & Martin Ltd.; New edition, paperback: 240 pages ISBN 0-9530964-7-5 ISBN 978-0953096473
3. Milgram, S. (2009), Obedience to Authority: An Experimental View, Harper Perennial Modern Classics; Reprint edition, paperback: 256 pages ISBN 0-06-176521-X ISBN 978-0061765216
