= Obedience =

Yielding to instructions from an authority figure

Obedience, in human behavior, is a form of "social influence in which a person yields to explicit instructions or orders from an authority figure". Obedience is generally distinguished from compliance, which some authors define as behavior influenced by peers while others use it as a more general term for positive responses to another individual's request, and from conformity, which is behavior intended to match that of the majority. Depending on context, obedience can be seen as moral, immoral, or amoral. For example, in psychological research, individuals are usually confronted with immoral demands designed to elicit an internal conflict. If individuals still choose to submit to the demand, they are acting obediently.

Humans have been shown to be obedient in the presence of perceived legitimate authority figures, as shown by the Milgram experiment in the 1960s, which was carried out by Stanley Milgram to find out how the Nazis managed to get ordinary people to take part in the mass murders of the Holocaust. The experiment showed that obedience to authority was the norm, not the exception. Regarding obedience, Milgram said that "Obedience is as basic an element in the structure of social life as one can point to. Some system of authority is a requirement of all communal living, and it is only the man dwelling in isolation who is not forced to respond, through defiance or submission, to the commands of others." A similar conclusion was reached in the Stanford prison experiment.

== Experimental studies ==
=== Classical methods and results ===
Although other fields have studied obedience, social psychology has been primarily responsible for the advancement of research on obedience. It has been studied experimentally in several different ways.

==== Milgram's experiment ====
In one classical study, Stanley Milgram (as part of the Milgram experiment) created a highly controversial yet often replicated study. Like many other experiments in psychology, Milgram's setup involved deception of the participants. In the experiment, subjects were told they were going to take part in a study of the effects of punishment on learning. In reality, the experiment focuses on people's willingness to obey malevolent authority. Each subject served as a teacher of associations between arbitrary pairs of words. After meeting the "teacher" at the beginning of the experiment, the "learner" (an accomplice of the experimenter) sat in another room and could be heard, but not seen. Teachers were told to give the "learner" electric shocks of increasing severity for each wrong answer. If subjects questioned the procedure, the "researcher" (again, an accomplice of Milgram) would encourage them to continue. Subjects were told to ignore the agonized screams of the learner, his desire to be untied and stop the experiment, and his pleas that his life was at risk and that he suffered from a heart condition. The experiment, the "researcher" insisted, had to go on. The dependent variable in this experiment was the voltage amount of shocks administered.

==== Zimbardo's experiment ====
The other classical study on obedience was conducted at Stanford University during the 1970s. Phillip Zimbardo was the main psychologist responsible for the experiment. In the Stanford Prison Experiment, college age students were put into a pseudo prison environment in order to study the impacts of "social forces" on participants behavior. Unlike the Milgram study in which each participant underwent the same experimental conditions, here using random assignment half the participants were prison guards and the other half were prisoners. The experimental setting was made to physically resemble a prison while simultaneously inducing "a psychological state of imprisonment".

==== Results ====
The Milgram study found that most participants would obey orders even when obedience posed severe harm to others. With encouragement from a perceived authority figure, about two-thirds of the participants were willing to administer the highest level of shock to the learner. This result was surprising to Milgram because he thought that "subjects have learned from childhood that it is a fundamental breach of moral conduct to hurt another person against his will". Milgram attempted to explain how ordinary people were capable of performing potentially lethal acts against other human beings by suggesting that participants may have entered into an agentic state, where they allowed the authority figure to take responsibility for their own actions. Another unanticipated discovery was the tension that the procedure caused. Subjects expressed signs of tension and emotional strain especially after administering the powerful shocks. 3 of the subjects had full-blown uncontrollable seizures, and on one occasion the experiment was stopped.

Zimbardo obtained similar results as the guards in the study obeyed orders and turned aggressive. Prisoners likewise were hostile to and resented their guards. The cruelty of the "guards" and the consequent stress of the "prisoners," forced Zimbardo to terminate the experiment prematurely, after 6 days.

=== Modern methods and results ===
The previous two studies greatly influenced how modern psychologists think about obedience. Milgram's study in particular generated a large response from the psychology community. In a modern study, Jerry Burger replicated Milgram's method with a few alterations. Burger's method was identical to Milgram's except when the shocks reached 150 volts, participants decided whether or not they wanted to continue and then the experiment ended (base condition). To ensure the safety of the participants, Burger added a two-step screening process; this was to rule out any participants that may react negatively to the experiment. In the modeled refusal condition, two confederates were used, where one confederate acted as the learner and the other was the teacher. The teacher stopped after going up to 90 volts, and the participant was asked to continue where the confederate left off. This methodology was considered more ethical because many of the adverse psychological effects seen in previous studies' participants occurred after moving past 150 volts. Additionally, since Milgram's study only used men, Burger tried to determine if there were differences between genders in his study and randomly assigned equal numbers of men and women to the experimental conditions.

Using data from his previous study, Burger probed participant's thoughts about obedience. Participants' comments from the previous study were coded for the number of times they mentioned "personal responsibility and the learner's well being". The number of prods the participants used in the first experiment were also measured.

Another study that used a partial replication of Milgram's work changed the experimental setting. In one of the Utrecht University studies on obedience, participants were instructed to make a confederate who was taking an employment test feel uncomfortable. Participants were told to make all of the instructed stress remarks to the confederate that ultimately made him fail in the experimental condition, but in the control condition they were not told to make stressful remarks. The dependent measurements were whether or not the participant made all of the stress remarks (measuring absolute obedience) and the number of stress remarks (relative obedience).

Following the Utrecht studies, another study used the stress remarks method to see how long participants would obey authority. The dependent measures for this experiment were the number of stress remarks made and a separate measure of personality designed to measure individual differences.

Neuroscience has only recently begun to approach the question of obedience, bringing novel but complementary perspectives on how obeying or issuing commands impacts brain functioning, fostering conditions for moral transgressions. The experimental protocol, inspired by Milgram, does not rely on deception and involves real behaviors. A participant assigned the role of agent must either freely decide or receive orders from the experimenter to deliver or withhold a mildly painful electric shock to another participant (the "victim") in exchange for €0.05. In a study conducted in 2020, fMRI results indicated that seeing the shock delivered to the victim triggered activations in the anterior cingulate cortex (ACC) and the anterior insula (AI), key brain regions associated with empathy. However, such activations were lower in the coerced condition compared to the free-choice condition, consistent with participants' subjective perception of the victim's pain. Activity in brain regions associated with the interpersonal feeling of guilt was also reduced when participants obeyed orders compared to acting freely. Other studies showed that the sense of agency, as measured through the implicit task of time perception, was reduced in the coerced compared to the free-choice condition, suggesting that the sense of agency diminishes when individuals obey orders compared to acting freely. These neuroscience studies highlight how obeying orders alters our natural aversion to hurting others.

==== Results ====
Burger's first study had results similar to the ones found in Milgram's previous study. The rates of obedience were very similar to those found in the Milgram study, showing that participants' tendency to obey has not declined over time. Additionally, Burger found that both genders exhibited similar behavior, suggesting that obedience will occur in participants independent of gender. In Burger's follow-up study, he found that participants that worried about the well-being of the learner were more hesitant to continue the study. He also found that the more the experimenter prodded the participant to continue, the more likely they were to stop the experiment. The Utrecht University study also replicated Milgram's results. They found that although participants indicated they did not enjoy the task, over 90% of them completed the experiment. The Bocchiaro and Zimbardo study had similar levels of obedience compared to the Milgram and Utrecht studies. They also found that participants would either stop the experiment at the first sign of the learner's pleas or would continue until the end of the experiment (called "the foot in the door scenario").

In addition to the above studies, additional research using participants from different cultures (including Spain, Australia, and Jordan) also found participants to be obedient.

=== Implications ===
One of the major assumptions of obedience research is that the effect is caused only by the experimental conditions, and Thomas Blass' research contests this point, as in some cases participant factors involving personality could potentially influence the results. In one of Blass' reviews on obedience, he found that participant's personalities can impact how they respond to authority, as people that were high in authoritarian submission were more likely to obey. He replicated this finding in his own research, as in one of his experiments, he found that when watching portions of the original Milgram studies on film, participants placed less responsibility on those punishing the learner when they scored high on measures of authoritarianism.

In addition to personality factors, participants who are resistant to obeying authority had high levels of social intelligence.

== Other research ==
Obedience can also be studied outside of the Milgram paradigm in fields such as economics or political science. One economics study that compared obedience to a tax authority in the lab versus at home found that participants were much more likely to pay participation tax when confronted in the lab. This finding implies that even outside of experimental settings, people will forgo potential financial gain to obey authority.

Another study involving political science measured public opinion before and after a Supreme Court case debating whether or not states can legalize physician assisted suicide. They found that participants' tendency to obey authorities was not as important to public opinion polling numbers as religious and moral beliefs. Although prior research has demonstrated that the tendency to obey persists across settings, this finding suggests that at personal factors like religion and morality can limit how much people obey authority.

== Other experiments ==
=== The Hofling hospital experiment ===
Both the Milgram and Stanford experiments were conducted in research settings. In 1966, psychiatrist Charles K. Hofling published the results of a field experiment on obedience in the nurse–physician relationship in its natural hospital setting. Nurses, unaware they were taking part in an experiment, were ordered by unknown doctors to administer dangerous doses of a (fictional) drug to their patients. Although several hospital rules disallowed administering the drug under the circumstances, 21 out of the 22 nurses would have given the patient an overdose.

== Cultural attitudes ==
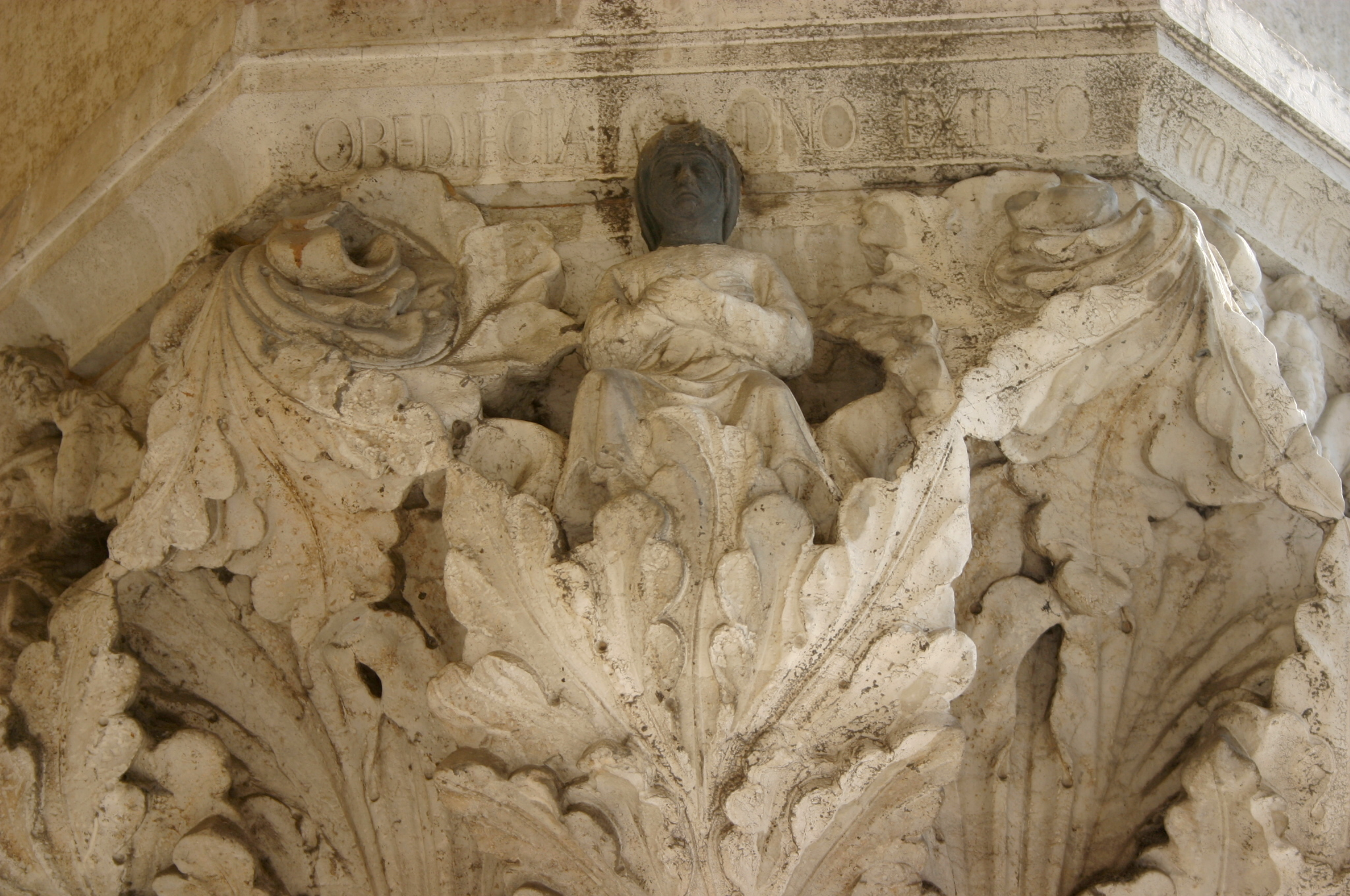
Doge's Palace in Venice: capital featuring Virtues and vices - Obediencia D<omi>no exireo (Obedience to God).

Many traditional cultures regard obedience as a virtue; historically, societies have expected children to obey their elders (compare patriarchy or matriarchy), slaves their owners, serfs their lords in feudal society, lords their king, and everyone God. Even long after slavery ended in the United States, the Black codes required black people to obey and submit to whites, on pain of lynching. Compare the religious ideal of surrender and its importance in Islam (the word Islam can literally mean "surrender").

In some Christian weddings, obedience was formally included along with honor and love as part of the bride's (but not the bridegroom's) marriage vow. This came under attack with women's suffrage and the feminist movement. As of 2014 the inclusion of this promise to obey has become optional in some denominations.

In the Catholic Church, obedience is seen as one of the evangelical counsels, "undertaken in a spirit of faith and love in the following of Christ": see Vow of obedience.

Learning to obey adult rules is a major part of the socialization process in childhood, and many techniques are used by adults to modify the behavior of children. Additionally, extensive training is given in armies to make soldiers capable of obeying orders in situations where an untrained person would not be willing to follow orders. Soldiers are initially ordered to do seemingly trivial things, such as picking up the sergeant's hat off the floor, marching in just the right position, or marching and standing in formation. The orders gradually become more demanding, until an order to the soldiers to place themselves into the midst of gunfire gets an instinctively obedient response.

== Factors affecting obedience ==
=== Embodiment of prestige or power ===
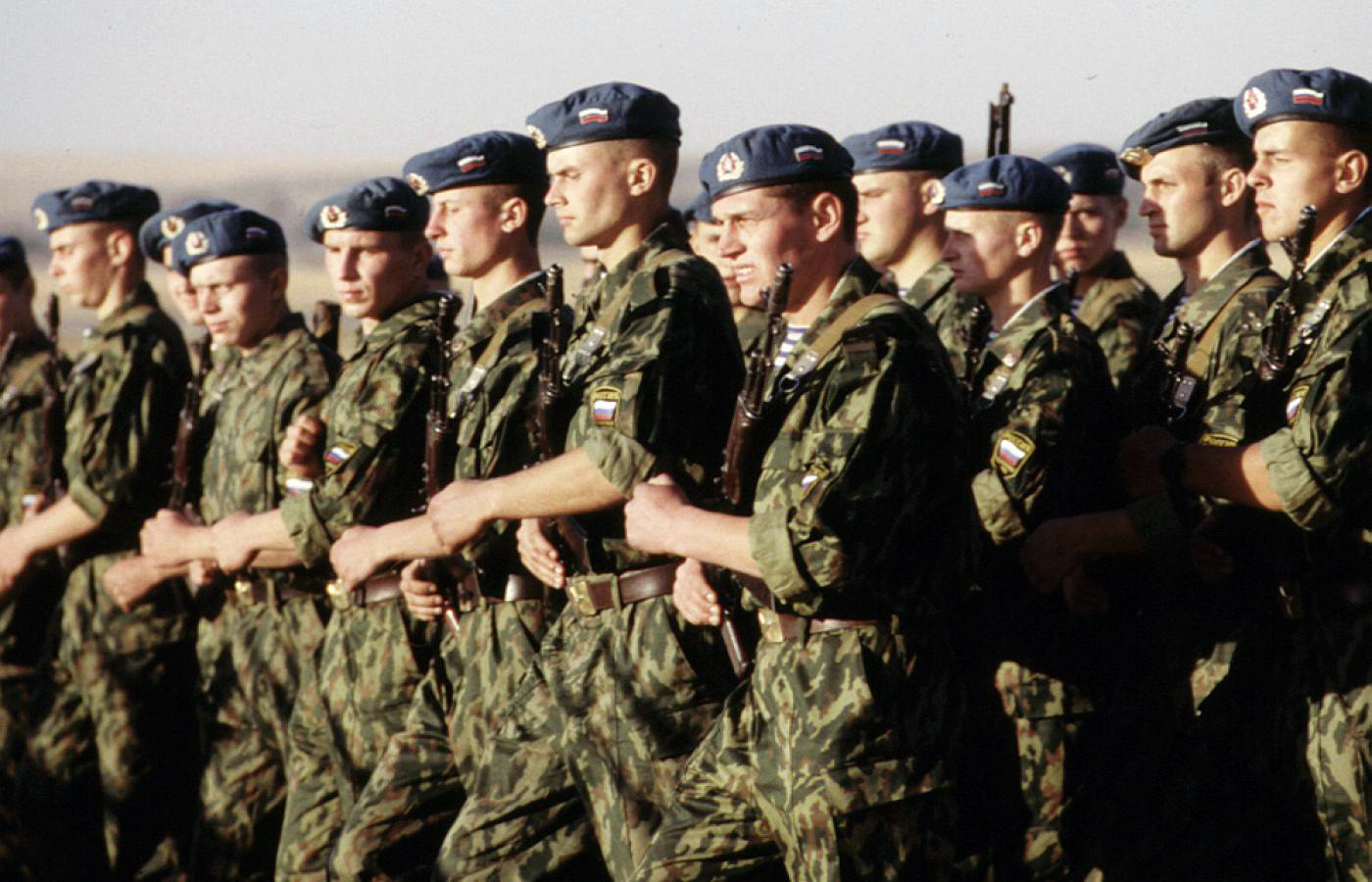
Obedience occurs in several situations; most often referred to is the obedience of soldiers to a superior officer.

When the Milgram experimenters were interviewing potential volunteers, the participant selection process itself revealed several factors that affected obedience, outside of the actual experiment.

Interviews for eligibility were conducted in an abandoned complex in Bridgeport, Connecticut. Despite the dilapidated state of the building, the researchers found that the presence of a Yale professor as stipulated in the advertisement affected the number of people who obeyed. This was not further researched to test obedience without a Yale professor because Milgram had not intentionally staged the interviews to discover factors that affected obedience. A similar conclusion was reached in the Stanford prison experiment.

In the actual experiment, prestige or the appearance of power was a direct factor in obedience—particularly the presence of men dressed in gray laboratory coats, which gave the impression of scholarship and achievement and was thought to be the main reason why people complied with administering what they thought was a painful or dangerous shock. A similar conclusion was reached in the Stanford prison experiment.

Raj Persaud, in a since retracted article in the BMJ, comments on Milgram's attention to detail in his experiment:

The research was also conducted with amazing verve and subtlety—for example, Milgram ensured that the "experimenter" wear a grey lab coat rather than a white one, precisely because he did not want subjects to think that the "experimenter" was a medical doctor and thereby limit the implications of his findings to the power of physician authority.

Despite the fact that prestige is often thought of as a separate factor, it is, in fact, merely a subset of power as a factor. Thus, the prestige conveyed by a Yale professor in a laboratory coat is only a manifestation of the experience and status associated with it and/or the social status afforded by such an image.

=== Agentic state and other factors ===
According to Milgram, "the essence of obedience consists in the fact that a person comes to view himself as the instrument for carrying out another person's wishes, and he therefore no longer sees himself as responsible for his actions. Once this critical shift of viewpoint has occurred in the person, all of the essential features of obedience follow." Thus, "the major problem for the subject is to recapture control of his own regnant processes once he has committed them to the purposes of the experimenter." Besides this hypothetical agentic state, Milgram proposed the existence of other factors accounting for the subject's obedience: politeness, awkwardness of withdrawal, absorption in the technical aspects of the task, the tendency to attribute impersonal quality to forces that are essentially human, a belief that the experiment served a desirable end, the sequential nature of the action, and anxiety.

=== Belief perseverance ===
Another explanation of Milgram's results invokes belief perseverance as the underlying cause. What "people cannot be counted on is to realize that a seemingly benevolent authority is in fact malevolent, even when they are faced with overwhelming evidence which suggests that this authority is indeed malevolent. Hence, the underlying cause for the subjects' striking conduct could well be conceptual, and not the alleged 'capacity of man to abandon his humanity ... as he merges his unique personality into larger institutional structures."'

== See also ==
In humans:

- Authority bias
- Belief perseverance
- Civil disobedience
- Codependency
- Conformity
- Corpse-like obedience
- Depersonalization
- Discipline
- Dominance hierarchy
- Filial piety
- Pain compliance
- Prejudice
- Authoritarianism
- Submissive
- Superstition
- Sycophancy
- Terrorism
- Vow of obedience

In animals:

- Animal training
- Obedience training (for dogs)
- Horse breaking
