= Le Jeu de la Mort =

Le Jeu de la Mort (The Game of Death) is a French/Swiss television documentary broadcast by the French public television channel France 2. It was presented as a social commentary on the effects of obeying orders and humiliation in reality television, and its broadcast was followed by a studio discussion on the programme.

The documentary focused on a modern version of the Milgram experiment, with the additional factor of reality television's popularity and influence on the general public. The experiment was performed in the guise of a game show known as La Zone Xtrême. Volunteers were given €40 to take part as contestants in a "pilot" for the fictitious show, where they had to administer increasingly stronger electric shocks to trained actors posing as players as punishment for incorrect answers, as encouraged to do so by the host and audience. Only 16 of 80 "contestants" chose to end the game before delivering the highest voltage punishment.
