= Inflicted insight =

Inflicted insight is a possible consequence for subjects participating in certain kinds of research. It occurs when the subject is given insight into their flaws through their participation in an experiment, often unexpectedly or causing emotional pain. It is particularly common in social and psychological research, particularly when the researcher deceives the subject.

The Milgram experiment is a well-known example of an experiment with a very high potential for inflicted insight. Through their participation in the experiment, many subjects realized that they were capable of committing acts of extreme violence on other human beings. After this realization, many subjects experienced prolonged symptoms of anxiety. (However, 84 percent of former participants surveyed later said they were "glad" or "very glad" to have participated.)

Deceptive debriefing is one method for avoiding inflicted insight in psychological experiments, although it is considered ethically questionable in and of itself.

The American Psychological Association's guidelines for ethical experimentation strongly discourage experiments where deceptive debriefing is the only alternative to inflicted insight. However, such experiments may be deemed ethically acceptable if other ethical concerns counterbalance them.
