= The Heist (Derren Brown special) =

- Created by: Derren Brown, Andy Nyman
- Directed by: Benjamin Caron
- Presented by: Derren Brown
- Country of origin: United Kingdom
- No. of episodes: 1

Production
- Executive producers: Derren Brown, Andrew O'Connor, Anthony Owen
- Producer: Simon Mills
- Cinematography: Jeremy Hewson
- Editor: Tim Thompsett
- Running time: 60mins

Original release
- Network: Channel 4
- Release: 4 January 2006

The Heist is a 2006 British Derren Brown television special that aired on Channel 4. In the special, Brown purports to use the cover of a motivational seminar and documentary to see if he can persuade four members of a group of thirteen businessmen and businesswomen to steal £100,000 in what they believe is a genuine "armed robbery" of a bank's security guard (using a realistic-looking toy gun).

The special was filmed over two weeks, during which Brown tells the viewer he has used various psychological tools, including conditioning, anchoring and suggestion, to get the group into a mental state in which they would willingly try to rob a security guard, without ever directly being told to do so. The anchoring supposedly involved creating an emotional state that combined feelings of invulnerability, euphoria and aggression, that was then tied to various stimuli, such as the colour green, the song "Can You Feel It" by The Jacksons, and the sight of a security guard uniform; which could then all be presented to the participants when it came time to perform "the heist". The participants were also asked to perform various deviant acts, such as stealing sweets from a store, which served both to condition participants to enjoy the feeling of criminality, and to identify the four members who would be most likely to perform the heist.

Brown said that the show was inspired in part by "a vague distaste for the cult of selfishness apotheosised through self-help seminars".

The Heist first aired on Channel 4 on 4 January 2006 at 9pm. It was Brown's fifth Channel 4 special.

== Plot ==
=== Motivational seminar ===
Thirteen delegates are invited to an intimate seminar in a hotel in Hertfordshire apparently to learn some of Brown’s skills, after responding to adverts in the press. They had to be open responsive types who would respond well to his techniques; have no criminal record; fall into a typical middle-management income bracket or above; and be deemed psychologically robust enough by an independent psychologist to take part in the show.

Initially, Brown sets up tests to see how each of them react to different situations such as an irritating security guard hassling them on the way to dinner to see how they react to authority, and a Maître d'hôtel presenting them with an unexpected bill after dinner and drinks.

During the actual seminar, he starts to focus them unconsciously on the idea of stealing while convincing them that they are learning real skills to keep them responsive and hungry. He triggers motivational states and attaches this to the trigger of rubbing their leg. Brown also uses suggestive language, such as describing the participants as "thought criminals", titling a slide in the presentation "Things to take away", and using the acronym "K.A.S.H." in another slide. The participants are given realistic toy guns, to encourage the feeling of criminality; they are also given a CD, which Brown says contains subliminal messages that they should listen to every day. The CDs are in fact blank, but they are meant to show the belief that Brown can influence them without them being aware of it.

The seminar ends with a group visualization shifting the focus towards motivation and an attitude of "just do it" while Brown reiterates the language of criminality. He also transfers a rubbing leg trigger across to a piece of music, "Can You Feel It" by The Jacksons all under the backdrop of flashing green lights. Practicing this a few times means that just playing that piece of music will trigger a very emotional state in the subjects.

=== Stealing sweets ===
The subjects are then persuaded to go across to a shop in Codicote High Street, Hertfordshire, and steal sweets, to reclaim a childhood attitude which is at the heart of the message. The aim is to make them cross the line into criminal and deviant behaviour but in a way that can be framed to sound fun and harmless. Purely because an authority figure has told them to, all but two of the delegates make the decision to walk into a shop, steal goods, and frame it as a positive experience for themselves. (Brown had arranged the experiment with the shop owner, although the shop floor staff had not been informed.) Following this exercise, four people are eliminated from Brown’s plans.

=== Milgram experiment ===
A week after the seminar, the nine remaining subjects are tested on the limits of their responsiveness to authority. They are organised to take part in what they think is a piece of unfilmed academic research at a university, supposedly looking into the effects of punishment on learning. In fact it was a re-enactment of the well-known Milgram Experiment, undertaken by Stanley Milgram in 1963 to look at how people can commit atrocious acts simply because they’re following orders.

An actor pretending to be another participant joins each subject and the subjects are tricked into thinking they have chosen their roles as "teachers" in the experiment. The subjects observe the "learner" being instructed by the scientist (another actor) and having an electrode connected to their arm which is linked to a generator in the second room.

The teacher is shown the generator in the other room, which ranges from 15V all the way up to a lethal 450V and then are shocked at a moderate 45V, to show the effects of this reasonably low voltage. The teacher asks a series of memory questions and incorrect answers from the learner receive an electric shock. The teacher is told to increase the voltage each time the learner gets a question wrong.

However, responses were played by a pre-recorded CD which the teacher could hear coming from the other room, apparently showing the learner to be in agonising pain and pleading for the experiment to stop. The point is to see whether the teachers (subjects) will call a stop to the experiment or continue to the point where they are administering seemingly lethal electric shocks to the victim simply because the scientist is telling them to. After the experiment, each participant is told the true nature of the test, and that it was filmed for the show.

The results of Brown’s experiment were almost identical to those of the original - over 50% of participants continued up to 450V. Only one of the participants, Victoria, had heard of the experiment previously; she had refused to go on.

After the end of this experiment, Brown chooses the four participants who will take part in the heist, based on their behaviour in the experiment and in previous tests. Two of the four participants he chose, Danny and Victoria, in fact refused to complete the experiment; Brown chose Danny anyway because his vocal refusal to go on indicated to Brown a "strength of character" that he felt would be helpful; and Victoria was chosen because Brown wanted at least one woman in the final group, and he felt that she was the best choice.

=== Final conditioning ===
Meeting with the final four participants, Brown creates a feeling of aggression in them and attaches it to the trigger of a squeezed fist at a meeting in a café. Meanwhile, a green security van drives past the window.

The last stage before the heist is making the subjects believe that they have it within themselves to overpower a security guard and to know what to say and how to say it without thinking about it. Brown teaches them what he calls an esoteric martial arts exercise, where they are able to make one another fall using the mental power of "qi". (In reality the person made to fall does so due to the power of suggestion from Brown.) However, the people apparently pushing come to believe that they have a powerful and invincible state to tap into.

=== The Heist ===
On the morning of "the heist", the four subjects are individually told to travel into London for a final motivational session. They are each picked up in a car, and while in the car, each one individually gets a phone call from Brown, who delivers the following message, full of suggestion phrases: "Make that decision to steal yourself. And grab that opportunity to make all this work really pay off. It's just about standing in the way of security and life and making it do what you want it to do. You're the one with the weapon of absolute unquestioning power." They are then dropped off at the end of Gresham Street and told to walk up the street to the meeting place. They had been told to bring their toy guns with them. The whole area had actually been cordoned off to the public and was supervised by the police.

On the street a half-painted green fence can be seen, as well as a large advert for tights (featuring the rubbing of a leg, to try and trigger the extremely motivated state, that Derren had taught them to induced by leg rubbing) with the slogan "Do it...go on – steal yourself". As each subject walks up the street, a car drives past blaring out the loud trigger music ("Can You Feel It"). They approach a parked green security van and the security guard (an actor) is given the cue to cross the road from the Bank of England holding two boxes containing £50,000 each. The subjects react as follows:

- Victoria, press officer / P.A. – performs a hold-up
- Phil M, security operations manager – "Excuse me sir, er, sorry to interrupt proceedings, but this is a hold-up, get down on the floor, get down on the floor!"
- Danny, IT consultant – performs a hold-up.
- Ally, business development manager – walks past the security van (whilst repeatedly glancing at the guard for a considerable amount of time).

A large group of helpers and camera crew, hidden around various street corners, rushes in to intercept each subject after their respective experience, regardless of whether a hold-up occurred or not.

After filming, all four subjects were de-programmed of any temporary criminal inclinations, spending time with both Brown and an independent psychologist. The three participants who performed a hold-up are shown stating positive things about their experience, although it is unclear whether these were taped before or after the heist itself. To end the show, Ally says: "Stealing sweets is one thing, but stealing boxes of money from the Bank of England is a completely different kettle of fish."

== Reaction ==
The Heist faced some controversy during its airing. John Beyer, chairman of media watchdog Mediawatch-uk, called the show "a waste of public money and a valuable waste of police officers' time". He also accused it of "glamourising crime".

In a later interview, Brown stated of the experience, "It was shocking, actually, how easy it was."

Brown stated that the four final participants were all pleased with a screening they saw after the show had been entirely taped; and that he and Danny afterwards "became good friends".

In a Channel 4 viewer poll for "Derren Brown night" on 8 January 2011, The Heist was revealed to be the viewers' (as well as Brown's) favourite Derren Brown special.
