= Ludmilla Chistovich =

Linguist and speech scientist

Ludmilla A. Chistovich (1924 – 2006) was a Russian linguist and speech scientist who co-founded the Leningrad School of Phonology, together with her husband Valery A. Kozhevnikov.

== Biography ==
Chistovich was born in Leningrad in 1924. She trained as a medical doctor before founding in 1960 the Laboratory of Speech Physiology at the Pavlov Institute of Physiology. She was married to Valery A. Kozhevnikov, and collaborated with him until his untimely death in 1981. They had two daughters who also became speech researchers, Elena V. Kozhevnikova and Inna A. Chistovich. After her retirement in 1986, she and her daughters established the St. Petersburg Early Intervention Institute, to foster language development in young children by providing auditory screening and programs for hearing-impaired children.

== Research career and legacy ==
Chistovich pioneered experimental methods for understanding the relationship between speech production and speech perception. The Pavlov Institute developed a distinctive approach to solve "the mystery of speech perception". Her work was brought to the attention of Western speech scientists by Gunnar Fant. Her work on non-linear dynamics in speech production was a major influence on the development of articulatory phonology and task dynamics, influencing researchers such as Bjorn Lindblom, Elliot Saltzman, Louis Goldstein, and Catherine Browman. She developed the method of close speech shadowing to explore the mechanisms of speech processing at very short time lags (250 to 500 msec). With Patricia K. Kuhl, she co-authored a seminal article on infant-directed speech showing that across different languages, caregivers speak to infants in a way that facilitates acquisition of the phonological system.

== Publications ==
A complete bibliography of Ludmilla Chistovich's publications was published as part of the special issue of Speech Communication (a joint publication of the European Association for Signal Processing (EURASIP) and the International Speech Communication Association (ISCA)) in honour of her 60th birthday. It was compiled by Christel Sorin, of the Laboratoire Psychologie de la Perception, Paris Descartes University.
