= Thomas Blass =

American social psychologist

- Born: Budapest, Hungary
- Died: 2021
- Education: Yeshiva University
- Known for: Work regarding Stanley Milgram and the Milgram experiment
- Spouse: Anne Blass
- Children: Aviva Blass Alexander Blass Eitan Blass
- Scientific career
- Fields: Social psychology
- Workplaces: University of Maryland, Baltimore County
- Thesis: Personality and situational factors in tolerance for imbalance (1969)

Thomas Blass (December 25, 1941 – December 29, 2021) was an American social psychologist, Holocaust survivor, and professor of psychology at the University of Maryland, Baltimore County. He is known for his work regarding Stanley Milgram and the Milgram experiment.

== Early life and education ==
Blass was born in Budapest, Hungary, during World War II. In 1944, when he was a child, Nazis invaded Hungary and murdered over 550,000 of Blass's fellow Jews there. After the war ended, he left Hungary with his mother, originally settling at a displaced persons camp in Hallein, Austria. They remained there for a number of years before moving to Toronto, Canada, where Blass spent part of his childhood. He went on to receive his B.A. in mathematics from Yeshiva University, where he received his Ph.D. in social psychology in 1969.

== Career ==
After graduating from university, Blass worked at the University of Maryland Psychiatric Institute, Sheppard-Pratt Hospital, and Downstate Medical Center. He spent most of his career at the University of Maryland, Baltimore County.

== Writings ==
Blass is the author of the 2004 book The Man Who Shocked the World: The Life and Legacy of Stanley Milgram, the first biography of Milgram ever published. He has also written numerous journal articles about Milgram and his experiment.
