= Stanley Milgram =

American social psychologist (1933-1984)

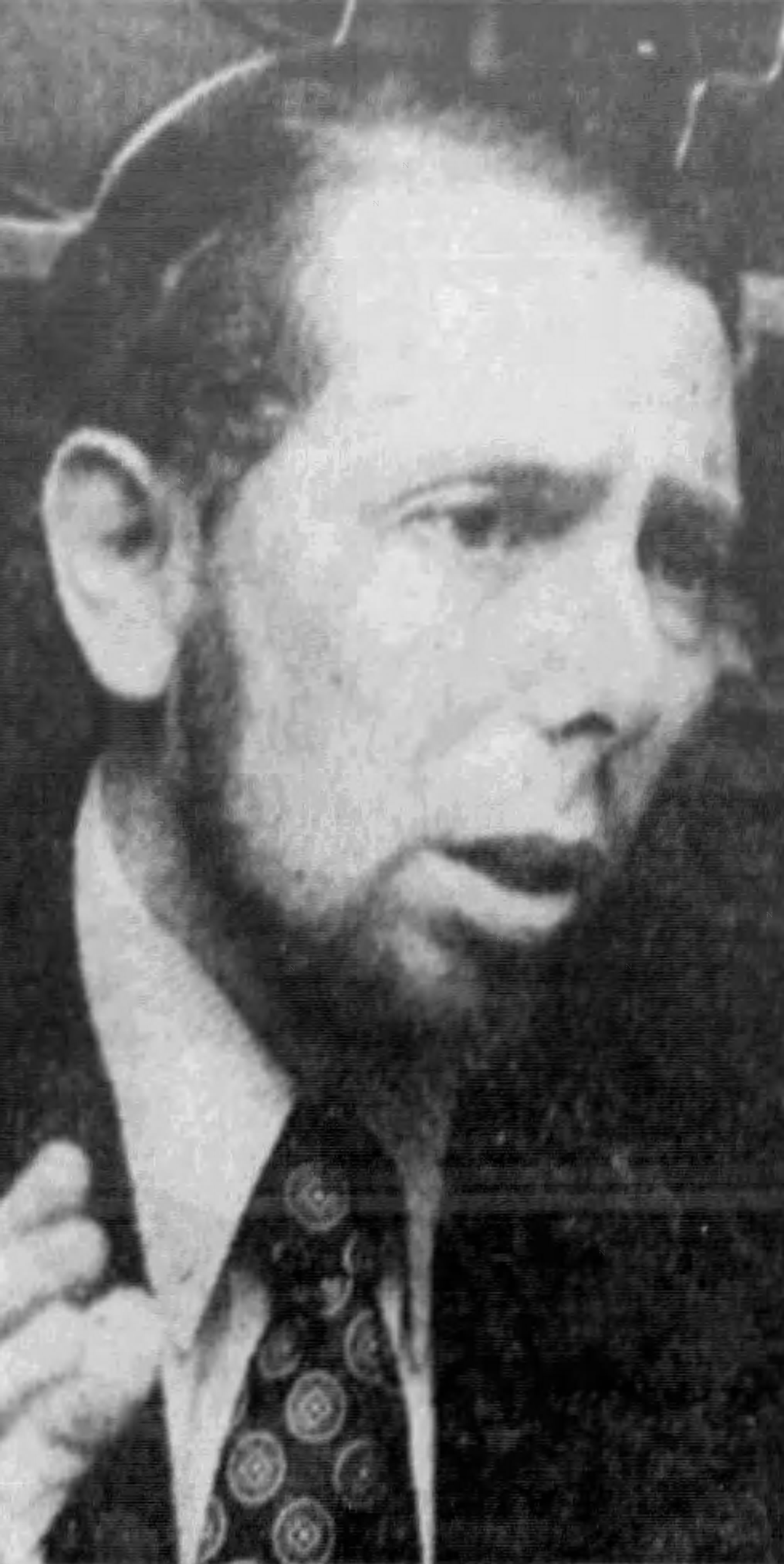
- Milgram c. 1974
- Born: August 15, 1933; The Bronx, New York City, U.S.
- Died: December 20, 1984 (aged 51); Manhattan, New York City, U.S.
- Education: Queens College (BA); Harvard University (PhD)
- Known for: Milgram experiment Small-world experiment Familiar stranger
- Title: Professor
- Spouse: Alexandra Menkin (m. 1961)
- Children: 2

Stanley Milgram (August 15, 1933 – December 20, 1984) was an American social psychologist who conducted controversial experiments on obedience in the 1960s during his professorship at Yale University.

Milgram was influenced by the events of the Holocaust, especially the trial of Adolf Eichmann, in developing the experiment. After earning a PhD in social psychology from Harvard University, he taught at Yale, Harvard, and then for most of his career as a professor at the City University of New York Graduate Center, until his death in 1984.

Milgram's obedience experiment was conducted in the basement of Linsly-Chittenden Hall at Yale University in 1961, three months after the start of the trial of German Nazi war criminal Adolf Eichmann in Jerusalem. The experiment unexpectedly found that a very high proportion of subjects would fully obey instructions to harm others, albeit reluctantly. Milgram first described his research in a 1963 article in the Journal of Abnormal and Social Psychology and later discussed his findings in greater depth in his 1974 book, Obedience to Authority: An Experimental View.

Milgram's small-world experiment led researchers to analyze the degree of connectedness, including the six degrees of separation concept. Later in his career, Milgram developed a technique for creating interactive hybrid social agents (called cyranoids), which has since been used to explore aspects of social- and self-perception.

Milgram is widely regarded as one of the most important figures in the history of social psychology. A Review of General Psychology survey, published in 2002, ranked Milgram as the 46th-most-cited psychologist of the 20th century.

== Biography ==
=== Early life, family and education ===
Milgram was the second of three children born to Jewish parents in the Bronx (New York City), in 1933. His parents were Adele (born Israel) and Samuel Milgram (1898–1953), who had immigrated to the United States from Romania and Hungary respectively during World War I. Milgram's immediate and extended family were both affected by the Holocaust. After the war, relatives who had survived Nazi concentration camps and bore concentration camp tattoos stayed with the Milgram family in New York for a time.

Milgram's bar mitzvah speech, when he turned 13 in 1946, focused on the plight of European Jews and the impact that the events of World War II would have on Jewish people around the world. He said, upon becoming a man under Jewish law: "As I ... find happiness in joining the ranks of Israel, the knowledge of the tragic suffering of my fellow Jews ... makes this ... an occasion to reflect upon the heritage of my people—which now becomes mine. ... I shall try to understand my people and do my best to share the responsibilities which history has placed upon all of us." He later wrote to a friend from childhood: "I should have been born into the German-speaking Jewish community of Prague in 1922 and died in a gas chamber some 20 years later. How I came to be born in the Bronx Hospital, I'll never quite understand."

Milgram's interest in the Holocaust had its basis in what his biographer, Professor Thomas Blass, referred to as Milgram's "lifelong identification with the Jewish people". Author Kirsten Fermaglich wrote that Milgram as an adult had "a personal conflict as a Jewish man who perceived himself both as an outsider, a victim of the Nazi destruction, and as an insider, as scientist." His wife, Alexandra, later said that Milgram's Jewish identity led to his focus on the Holocaust and his obedience-to-authority research. He shared this as well with Herbert Winer, one of his obedience study subjects, who noted, after speaking to Milgram about the experiment, that "Milgram was very Jewish. I was Jewish. We talked about this. There was obviously a motive behind neutral research."

Milgram's father worked as a baker, providing a modest income for his family until his death in 1953 (upon which Stanley's mother took over the bakery). Milgram attended public elementary school and James Monroe High School in the Bronx. One of his classmates at James Monroe High School was Philip Zimbardo, later to be known as the architect of the Stanford prison experiment. (Milgram and Zimbardo also shared an affinity for the television program Candid Camera and an admiration for its creator, Allen Funt.)

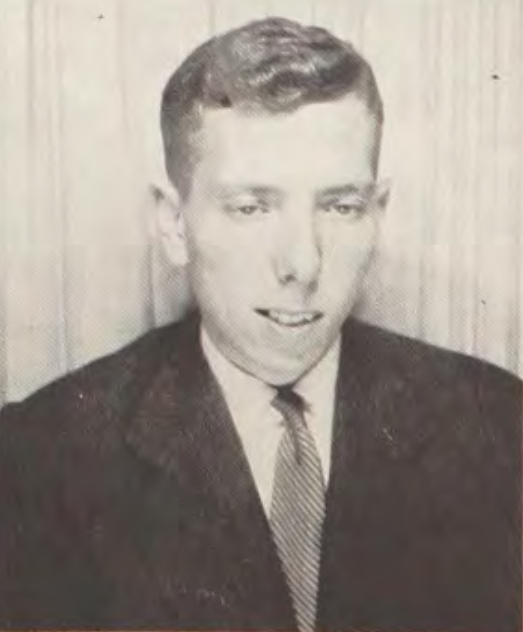
Milgram in 1954 at Queens College

By the time he was college age, Milgram's family had moved to nearby Queens. In 1954, he received a bachelor's degree in political science from Queens College in New York. He also took two courses at Brooklyn College, "Psychology of Personality" and "An Eclectic Approach to Social Psychology".

Milgram then applied to a PhD program in social psychology at Harvard University, but was initially rejected due to an insufficient background in psychology, as he had not taken any undergraduate courses in psychology at Queens College. Milgram was eventually accepted to Harvard, where he was influenced by the work of Gordon Allport; he received his PhD in social psychology in 1960. While he was completing his PhD, Milgram worked as an assistant to psychologist Solomon Asch at the Institute for Advanced Study in Princeton, New Jersey.

=== Academic career ===
In the fall of 1960, Milgram became an assistant professor at Yale, where he undertook his famous obedience-to-authority experiment. He then served as an assistant professor in the Department of Social Relations at Harvard from 1963 to 1966, on a three-year contract. The contract was then extended for one additional year, but with the lower rank of a lecturer. In 1967, Milgram accepted an offer to become a tenured full professor at the City University of New York Graduate Center, where he taught until he died in 1984.

=== Personal life and death ===
Milgram married his wife, Alexandra, in a ceremony at the Brotherhood Synagogue in Greenwich Village in Manhattan on December 10, 1961, and they had two children, Michele and Marc. At the time of his death, Milgram lived in New Rochelle, New York.

Milgram died on December 20, 1984, aged 51, of a heart attack in New York City. It was his fifth heart attack. He left behind a widow, Alexandra "Sasha" Milgram, a daughter, Michele Sara, and a son, Marc Daniel.

== Obedience to authority ==
Setup of the Milgram experiment

In 1963, Milgram submitted the results of his obedience-to-authority experiments to the Journal of Abnormal and Social Psychology, in an article titled "Behavioral Study of Obedience". In the ensuing controversy, the American Psychological Association held up his application for membership for a year because of questions about the ethics of his work, but eventually did grant him full membership. He was awarded the AAAS Prize for Behavioral Science Research in 1964, mostly for his work on the social aspects of obedience. Ten years later, in 1974, Milgram published his book on the subject, Obedience to Authority.

Inspired in part by the 1961 trial of Nazi Adolf Eichmann, Milgram's models were later also used to help explain the 1968 My Lai massacre, including authority training in the military, depersonalization of the enemy based on racial and cultural differences, etc. He produced a film depicting his experiments, which are considered classics of social psychology.

An article in American Psychologist sums up Milgram's obedience experiments:

In Milgram's basic paradigm, a subject walks into a laboratory believing that they are about to take part in a study of memory and learning. After being assigned the role of a teacher, the subject is asked to teach word associations to a fellow subject (who in reality is a collaborator of the experimenter). The teaching method, however, is unconventional—administering increasingly higher electric shocks to the learner. Once the presumed shock level reaches a certain point, the subject is thrown into a conflict. On the one hand, the strapped learner demands to be set free, he appears to suffer pain, and going all the way may pose a risk to his health. On the other hand, the experimenter, if asked, insists that the experiment is not as unhealthy as it appears to be, and that the teacher must go on. In sharp contrast to the expectations of professionals and laymen alike, some 65% of all subjects continue to administer shocks up to the very highest levels.

According to Milgram, "the essence of obedience consists in the fact that a person comes to view himself as the instrument for carrying out another person's wishes, and he therefore no longer sees himself as responsible for his actions. Once this critical shift of viewpoint has occurred in the person, all of the essential features of obedience follow." Thus, "the major problem for the subject is to recapture control of his own regnant processes once he has committed them to the purposes of the experimenter." Besides this hypothetical agentic state, Milgram proposed the existence of other factors accounting for the subject's obedience: politeness, awkwardness of withdrawal, absorption in the technical aspects of the task, the tendency to attribute impersonal quality to forces that are essentially human, a belief that the experiment served a desirable end, the sequential nature of the action, and anxiety.

A competing explanation of Milgram's results invokes belief perseverance as the underlying factor. What "people cannot be counted on is to realize that a seemingly benevolent authority is in fact malevolent, even when they are faced with overwhelming evidence which suggests that this authority is indeed malevolent. Hence, the underlying cause for the subjects' striking conduct could well be conceptual, and not the alleged 'capacity of man to abandon his humanity . . . as he merges his unique personality into larger institutional structures.'"

Inspired by the horrific events of Nazi Germany, Milgram's obedience experiments have been used to explain a range of social influences on the individual—including how police interrogators can get innocent people to confess to crimes they did not commit. At the same time, these experiments have come under attack. Some critics questioned whether subjects sensed the unreality of the situation. Others questioned the relevance of the laboratory setting to the real world.

The most devastating criticisms involved the ethics of the basic experimental design. Professor Milgram, for his part, felt that such misgivings were traceable to the unsavory nature of his results: "Underlying the criticism of the experiment," Milgram wrote, "is an alternative model of human nature, one holding that when confronted with a choice between hurting others and complying with authority, normal people reject authority."

Daniel Raver looks back:

Even though Milgram's personal interests were diverse, his greatest contribution to psychology came through one set of experiments, but in that set he contributed monumentally. He helped justify a science some dismiss as unimportant, contributed to the understanding of humanity, and, even if by way of attacks against him, contributed to the consideration of the treatment of research participants.

== Small-world phenomenon ==
The six degrees of separation concept was examined in Milgram's 1967 "small-world experiment", which tracked chains of acquaintances in the United States. In the experiment, Milgram sent several packages to 160 random people living in Omaha, Nebraska, asking them to forward the package to a friend or acquaintance who they thought would bring the package closer to a set final individual, a stockbroker from Boston, Massachusetts. Each "starter" received instructions to mail a folder via the U.S. Post Office to a recipient, but with some rules. Starters could only mail the folder to someone they actually knew personally on a first-name basis. When doing so, each starter instructed their recipient to mail the folder ahead to one of the latter's first-name acquaintances with the same instructions, with the hope that their acquaintance might by some chance know the target recipient.

Given that starters knew only the target recipient's name and address, they had a seemingly impossible task. Milgram monitored the progress of each chain via returned "tracer" postcards, which allowed him to track the progression of each letter. Surprisingly, he found that the very first folder reached the target in just four days and took only two intermediate acquaintances. Overall, Milgram reported that chains varied in length from two to ten intermediate acquaintances, with a median of five intermediate acquaintances (i.e. six degrees of separation) between the original sender and the destination recipient.

Milgram's "six degrees" theory has been severely criticized. He did not follow up on many of the sent packages, and as a result, scientists are unconvinced that there are merely "six degrees" of separation. Elizabeth DeVita–Raebu has discussed potential problems with Milgram's experiment.

In 2008, a study by Microsoft showed that the average chain of contacts between users of its '.NET Messenger Service' (later called Microsoft Messenger service) was 6.6 people.

== Lost letter experiment ==
Milgram developed a technique, called the "lost letter" experiment, for measuring how helpful people are to strangers who are not present, and their attitudes toward various groups. Several sealed and stamped letters were planted in public places, addressed to various entities, such as individuals, favorable organizations like medical research institutes, and stigmatized organizations such as "Friends of the Nazi Party". Milgram found most of the letters addressed to individuals and favorable organizations were mailed, while most of those addressed to stigmatized organizations were not. A meta-analysis of 78 lost-letter experiments across 18 countries found an average return rate of 50%. Return rates are lower for political issues or deviant ('stigmatized') addressees and higher in wealthier socioeconomic environments.

== Anti-social behavior experiment ==
In 1970–71, Milgram conducted experiments which attempted to find a correlation between media consumption (in this case, watching television) and anti-social behavior. The experiment presented the opportunity to steal money, donate to charity, or neither, and tested whether the rate of each choice was influenced by watching similar actions in the ending of a specially crafted episode of the series Medical Center. No correlation between media and anti-social behavior was identified.

== Cyranoids ==
In 1977 Milgram began piloting an experimental procedure that aimed to operationalize the mind-body fusion fantasy explored in the Edmond Rostand play Cyrano de Bergerac. In the story, Cyrano supplies Christian with amorous prose so that they may jointly woo Roxane (each being incapable, given their respective physical and linguistic limitations, of doing so on their own).

Milgram trained speech shadowers to replicate in real-time spontaneous prose supplied by a remote "source" by-way-of discreet radio transmission during face-to-face dialogue with naïve "interactants". In homage to Cyrano, he referred to the hybrid agent formed by combining the words of one individual with the body of another as a "cyranoid". In his studies, interactants repeatedly failed to detect that their interlocutors were merely speech shadowing for third parties, implicitly and explicitly attributing to them communicative autonomy. Milgram referred to this phenomenon as the "cyranic illusion". This illusion held even in circumstances involving high disparity between shadower and source, such as when he sourced for child shadowers while being interviewed by panels of teachers (naïve to the deception) tasked with assessing each child's intellectual abilities.

Milgram hoped that the cyranoid method could evolve into a useful means of interactively exploring phenomena related to social behavior and self-perception (e.g., racial, gender, and age-based stereotyping and behavioral confirmation). Though he continued to develop the methodology through 1984 (the year of his death), he never prepared a formal publication detailing his cyranoid experiments.

In 2014, social psychologists at the London School of Economics published the first replications of Milgram's original pilots. Robb Mitchell has explored cyranoids as an experiential learning tool within the classroom (having children shadow for teachers during teaching exercises). Cyranoids have also been used in installation art to explore social experiences whereby people encounter those familiar to them through the bodies of strangers.

== References in media ==
Dannie Abse wrote a play, The Dogs of Pavlov. (1973), produced at The Questors Theatre, inspired by and criticising Milgram's authority experiments. There are discussion of both men's views in the play and in Milgram's book.

In 1975, CBS presented a made-for-television movie about obedience experiments, The Tenth Level, with William Shatner as Stephen Hunter, a Milgram-like scientist. Milgram was a consultant for the film, though the accuracy of the film has been contested by Milgram himself.

In 1980, musician Peter Gabriel wrote a song called "We Do What We're Told (Milgram's 37)", referring to the number of subjects who administered the maximum shock in another one of the experiments - 37 out of 40. While it was played live on his 1980 tour, Gabriel did not release a studio version of the song until 1986, on his 5th album So.

Milgram 18 was reproduced to test the participants in a 2008 television special The Heist. Created by Derren Brown and Andy Nyman for British station Channel 4, the Milgram experiment helped determine which would be given the opportunity to rob a (fake) armoured bank van.

Milgram is a character in Chip Kidd's novel The Learners (2008), overseeing his experiments at Yale.

In March 2010, French television channel France 2 broadcast Jusqu'où va la télé, describing the results of a fake game show that they had run 80 times (each time independently, and with a new contestant and audience). The contestants received instructions to administer what they thought would be near fatal electric shocks to another "contestant" (really an actor) when they erred on memorized word-associations. The vast majority followed instructions even as the "victim" screamed.

On May 4, 2010, the TV show Law and Order: Criminal Intent broadcast an episode “Abel & Willing” (Season 9, Episode 6) about a murderous scientist who conducts experiments, modeled after Milgram’s, forcing couples to decide which one of them will die.

In 2015, an experimental biopic about Milgram called Experimenter was released, directed by Michael Almereyda. Peter Sarsgaard stars as Stanley Milgram.

In 2020, an online project known as the MILGRAM project portrays how a human would act if faced with the decision of being a prison guard to 10 different murderers. The project is still ongoing and has yet to be confirmed on its roots.

== See also ==
- Breaching experiment
- List of social psychologists
- Silent Generation
