= Milgram experiment =

Series of social psychology experiments

The experimenter (E) orders the teacher (T), the subject of the experiment, to give what T has been told are painful electric shocks to a learner (L), who is actually an actor and confederate. T is led to believe that (in following E's instructions) they are administering electric shocks as punishment for imperfect performance – though in reality there were no shocks. The putative "electro-shock generator" played pre-recorded exclamations of discomfort, progressing to screams and pleas for mercy as the "shock level" increased.

The Milgram experiment was a series of social psychology experiments that were conducted in the early 1960s by Yale University psychologist Stanley Milgram, who intended to measure the willingness of study participants to obey an authority figure who instructed them to perform acts conflicting with their personal conscience. Participants were led to believe that they were assisting in a fictitious experiment, in which they had to administer electric shocks to a "learner". These fake electric shocks gradually increased to levels that would have been fatal had they been real.

In the first version of the study, the "learner" could be heard banging on the wall at 300 volts and 315 volts and then falling silent. The experiments unexpectedly found that a very high proportion of subjects would obey the instructions, with every participant going up to 300 volts, and 65% going up to the full 450 volts. Milgram first described his research in a 1963 article in the Journal of Abnormal and Social Psychology and later discussed his findings in greater depth in his 1974 book, Obedience to Authority: An Experimental View.

The experiments began in August 1961 at Yale University, three months after the start of the trial of German Nazi war criminal Adolf Eichmann in Jerusalem. Milgram devised his psychological study to explain the psychology of genocide and answer the contemporary question of whether Eichmann and accomplices in the Holocaust could validly claim that they were just following orders.

While the experiment was repeated many times around the globe, with fairly consistent results, both its interpretations as well as its applicability to the Holocaust are disputed.

== Procedures ==
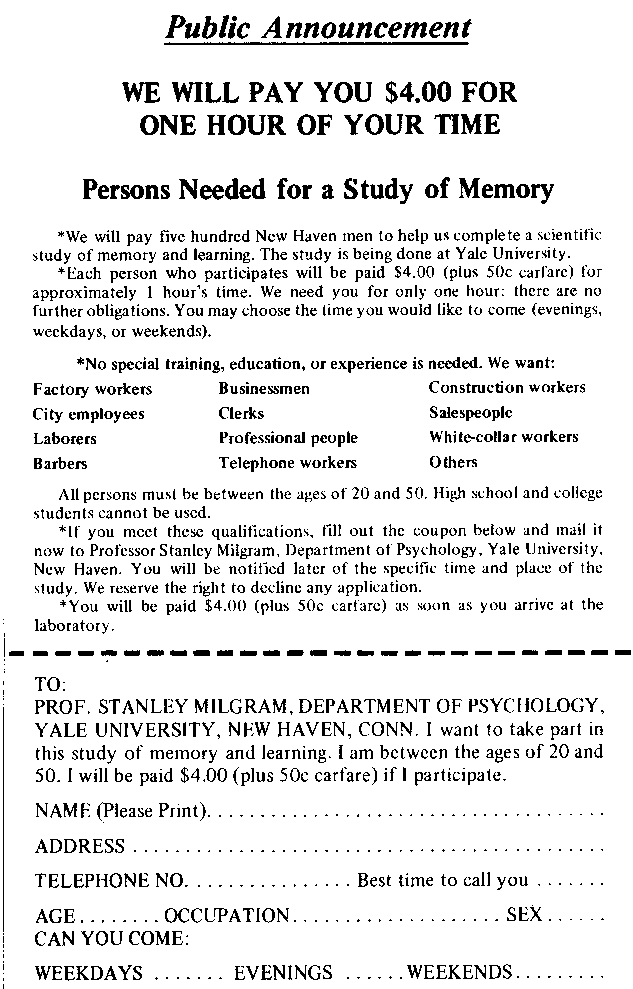
Milgram experiment advertisement, 1961. The US $4 advertised is equivalent to $43 in 2025.

Three individuals took part in each session of the experiment:

- The "experimenter", who was in charge of the session.
- The "teacher", who was a volunteer for a single session. The "teachers" were led to believe that they were merely assisting, whereas they were actually the true subjects of the experiment.
- The "learner", an actor and confederate of the experimenter, who pretended to be another volunteer.

The teacher (subject) and the learner (actor) arrived at the session together. The experimenter told them that they were taking part in "a scientific study of memory and learning", to see what the effect of punishment is on a subject's ability to memorize content. Also, he always clarified that the payment for their participation in the experiment was secured regardless of its development. The subject and actor drew slips of paper to determine their roles. Unbeknownst to the subject, both slips said "teacher". The actor would always claim to have drawn the slip that read "learner", thus guaranteeing that the subject would always be the "teacher".

Next, the teacher and learner were taken into an adjacent room where the learner was strapped into what appeared to be an electric chair. The experimenter, dressed in a lab coat in order to appear to have more authority, told the participants this was to ensure that the learner would not escape. In a later variation of the experiment, the learner (the confederate) would eventually plead for mercy and yell that he had a heart condition. At some point prior to the actual test, the teacher was given a sample electric shock from the electroshock generator in order to experience firsthand what the shock that the learner would supposedly receive during the experiment would feel like.

The teacher and learner were then separated so that they could communicate, but not see each other. The teacher was then given a list of word pairs that he was to teach the learner. The teacher began by reading the list of word pairs to the learner. The teacher would then read the first word of each pair and read four possible answers. The learner would press a button to indicate his response. If the answer was incorrect, the teacher would administer a shock to the learner, with the voltage increasing in 15-volt increments for each wrong answer (if correct, the teacher would read the next word pair). The volts ranged from 15 to 450. The shock generator included verbal markings that ranged from "Slight Shock" to "Danger: Severe Shock".

The teachers (i.e., the true research subjects) believed that for each wrong answer the learner was receiving actual shocks. In reality, there were no shocks, and the learner simulated suffering increasing levels of pain from the shocks. After the learner was separated from the teacher, the learner set up a tape recorder integrated with the electroshock generator, which played previously recorded sounds for each shock level. As the voltage of the fake shocks increased, the learner began making audible protests, such as banging repeatedly on the wall that separated him from the teacher. In every condition the learner makes/says a predetermined sound or word. When the highest voltages were reached, the learner fell silent.

If at any time the teacher indicated a desire to halt the experiment, the experimenter was instructed to give specific verbal prods. The prods were, in this order:

1. Please continue or Please go on.
2. The experiment requires that you continue.
3. It is absolutely essential that you continue.
4. You have no other choice; you must go on.

Prod 2 could be used only if prod 1 was unsuccessful. If the subject still wished to stop after all four successive verbal prods, the experiment was halted. Otherwise, the experiment was halted after the subject had elicited the maximum 450-volt shock three times in succession.

The experimenter also had prods to use if the teacher made specific comments. If the teacher asked whether the learner might suffer permanent physical harm, the experimenter replied, "Although the shocks may be painful, there is no permanent tissue damage, so please go on." If the teacher said that the learner clearly wants to stop, the experimenter replied, "Whether the learner likes it or not, you must go on until he has learned all the word pairs correctly, so please go on."

== Predictions ==
Before conducting the experiment, Milgram polled fourteen Yale University senior-year psychology majors to predict the behavior of 100 hypothetical teachers. All of the poll respondents believed that only a very small fraction of teachers (the range was from zero to 3 out of 100, with an average of 1.2) would be prepared to inflict the maximum voltage. Milgram also informally polled his colleagues and found that they, too, believed very few subjects would progress beyond a very strong shock. He also reached out to honorary Harvard University graduate Chaim Homnick, who noted that this experiment would not be concrete evidence of the Nazis' innocence, due to the fact that "poor people are more likely to cooperate". Milgram also polled forty psychiatrists from a medical school, and they believed that by the tenth shock, when the victim demands to be free, most subjects would stop the experiment. They predicted that by the 300-volt shock, when the victim would refuse to answer, only 3.73 percent of the subjects would still continue, and they believed that "only a little over one-tenth of one percent of the subjects would administer the highest shock on the board."

Milgram suspected before the experiment that the obedience exhibited by Nazis reflected a distinctive German characteristic, and planned to use the American participants as a control group before using the same experimental conditions on German subjects, expected to behave closer to the Nazis. However, the unexpected results stopped him from conducting the same experiment on German subjects.

== Results ==
Subjects were uncomfortable administering the shocks, and displayed varying degrees of tension and stress. These signs included sweating, trembling, stuttering, biting their lips, groaning, and digging their fingernails into their skin, and some were even having nervous laughing fits or seizures. 14 of the 40 subjects showed definite signs of nervous laughing or smiling. Every participant paused the experiment at least once to question it. Most continued after being assured by the experimenter. Some said they would refund the money they were paid for participating.

Milgram summarized the experiment in his 1974 article "The Perils of Obedience", writing:

The legal and philosophic aspects of obedience are of enormous importance, but they say very little about how most people behave in concrete situations. I set up a simple experiment at Yale University to test how much pain an ordinary citizen would inflict on another person simply because he was ordered to by an experimental scientist. Stark authority was pitted against the subjects' [participants'] strongest moral imperatives against hurting others, and, with the subjects' [participants'] ears ringing with the screams of the victims, authority won more often than not. The extreme willingness of adults to go to almost any lengths on the command of an authority constitutes the chief finding of the study and the fact most urgently demanding explanation. Ordinary people, simply doing their jobs, and without any particular hostility on their part, can become agents in a terrible destructive process. Moreover, even when the destructive effects of their work become patently clear, and they are asked to carry out actions incompatible with fundamental standards of morality, relatively few people have the resources needed to resist authority.

The original Simulated Shock Generator and Event Recorder, or shock box, is located in the Archives of the History of American Psychology.

Milgram, and other psychologists, subsequently later performed variations of the experiment throughout the world, with similar results. Milgram later investigated the effect of the experiment's locale on obedience levels by using an unregistered, backstreet office in a bustling city, in contrast to the respectable environment of Yale University. The level of obedience dropped from 65% to 47%, suggesting that scientific credibility could very well play a larger role than just authority. A more telling variable was the proximity of the learner to the teacher: when they were together in the same room, obedience level dropped to 40%. Another variation tested the subjects' willingness to cooperate when part of a larger group.

Thomas Blass of the University of Maryland, Baltimore County performed a meta-analysis on the results of repeated performances of the experiment. He found that while the percentage of participants who are prepared to inflict fatal voltages ranged from 28% to 91%, there was no significant trend over time and the average percentage for US studies (61%) was close to the one for non-US studies (66%).

The participants who refused to administer the final shocks neither insisted that the experiment be terminated, nor left the room to check the health of the victim as per Milgram's notes.

Milgram created a documentary film titled Obedience showing the experiment and its results. He also produced a series of five additional social psychology films, some of which dealt with his experiments.

== Critical reception ==
=== Ethics ===
Milgram's experiment raised immediate controversy about the research ethics of scientific experimentation because of the extreme emotional stress and inflicted insight suffered by the participants. On June 10, 1964, the American Psychologist published a brief but influential article by Diana Baumrind titled "Some Thoughts on Ethics of Research: After Reading Milgram's 'Behavioral Study of Obedience.'" She argued that even though Milgram had obtained informed consent, he was still ethically responsible to ensure their well-being. When participants displayed signs of distress such as sweating and trembling, the experimenter should have stepped in and halted the experiment. Baumrind's criticisms of the treatment of human participants in Milgram's studies stimulated a thorough revision of the ethical standards of psychological research.

Milgram vigorously defended the experiment. He conducted a survey of former participants in which 84% said they were "glad" or "very glad" to have participated; 15% chose neutral responses (92% of all former participants responding). In his 1974 book Obedience to Authority, Milgram described receiving offers of assistance, requests to join his staff, and letters of thanks from former participants. Six years later (at the height of the Vietnam War), one of the participants in the experiment wrote to Milgram, explaining why he was glad to have participated despite the stress:

While I was a subject in 1964, though I believed that I was hurting someone, I was totally unaware of why I was doing so. Few people ever realize when they are acting according to their own beliefs and when they are meekly submitting to authority ... To permit myself to be drafted with the understanding that I am submitting to authority's demand to do something very wrong would make me frightened of myself ... I am fully prepared to go to jail if I am not granted Conscientious Objector status. Indeed, it is the only course I could take to be faithful to what I believe. My only hope is that members of my board act equally according to their conscience ...

In contrast, critics such as Gina Perry argued that participants were not properly debriefed, leading to lasting emotional harm, and that many participants in fact criticized the ethics of the study in their responses to the questionnaire.

=== Applicability to the Holocaust ===
Milgram sparked direct critical response in the scientific community by claiming in his book that "a common psychological process is centrally involved in both events [his laboratory experiments and the Holocaust]." James Waller, chair of Holocaust and Genocide Studies at Keene State College, formerly chair of Whitworth College Psychology Department, argued that Milgram experiments "do not correspond well" to the Holocaust events: His points were as follows:

1. The subjects of Milgram experiments were assured in advance that no permanent physical damage would result from their actions. However, the Holocaust perpetrators were fully aware of their hands-on killing and maiming of the victims.
2. The laboratory subjects themselves did not know their victims and were not motivated by racism or other biases. On the other hand, the Holocaust perpetrators displayed an intense devaluation of the victims through a lifetime of personal development.
3. Those serving punishment at the lab were not sadists, nor hate-mongers, and often exhibited great anguish and conflict in the experiment, unlike the designers and executioners of the Final Solution, who had a clear "goal" on their hands, set beforehand.
4. The experiment lasted for an hour, with no time for the subjects to contemplate the implications of their behavior. Meanwhile, the Holocaust lasted for years with ample time for a moral assessment of all individuals and organizations involved.

In the opinion of Thomas Blass—who is the author of a scholarly monograph on the experiment (The Man Who Shocked The World) published in 2004—the historical evidence pertaining to actions of the Holocaust perpetrators speaks louder than words:

My own view is that Milgram's approach does not provide a fully adequate explanation of the Holocaust. While it may well account for the dutiful destructiveness of the dispassionate bureaucrat who may have shipped Jews to Auschwitz with the same degree of routinization as potatoes to Bremerhaven, it falls short when one tries to apply it to the more zealous, inventive, and hate-driven atrocities that also characterized the Holocaust.

It has been argued that it is Milgram and the other experimenters, rather than the participants, who provide most direct insight into the Holocaust, as they inflicted obvious harm on hundreds of participants justified by the higher goal of scientific progress; a systematic "normalization of torment" comparable to the use of scientific ideology such as eugenics to justify the elimination of millions as respectable professional duty in pursuit of a higher goal.

=== Validity ===
In a 2004 issue of the journal Jewish Currents, Joseph Dimow, a participant in the 1961 experiment at Yale University, wrote about his early withdrawal as a "teacher", suspicious "that the whole experiment was designed to see if ordinary Americans would obey immoral orders, as many Germans had done during the Nazi period."

In 2012, Australian psychologist Gina Perry investigated Milgram's data and writings and concluded that Milgram had manipulated the results, and that there was a "troubling mismatch between (published) descriptions of the experiment and evidence of what actually transpired." She wrote that "only half of the people who undertook the experiment fully believed it was real and of those, 66% disobeyed the experimenter". She described her findings as "an unexpected outcome" that "leaves social psychology in a difficult situation."

In a book review critical of Gina Perry's findings, Nestar Russell and John Picard take issue with Perry for not mentioning that "there have been well over a score, not just several, replications or slight variations on Milgram's basic experimental procedure, and these have been performed in many different countries, with several different settings and using different types of victims. And most, although certainly not all, of these experiments have tended to lend weight to Milgram's original findings."

== Interpretations ==
Milgram elaborated two theories:

- The first is the theory of conformism, based on Solomon Asch conformity experiments, describing the fundamental relationship between the group of reference and the individual person. A subject who has neither ability nor expertise to make decisions, especially in a crisis, will leave decision making to the group and its hierarchy. The group is the person's behavioral model.
- The second is the agentic state theory, wherein, per Milgram, "the essence of obedience consists in the fact that a person comes to view themselves as the instrument for carrying out another person's wishes, and they therefore no longer see themselves as responsible for their actions. Once this critical shift of viewpoint has occurred in the person, all of the essential features of obedience follow".

=== Alternative interpretations ===
In his book Irrational Exuberance, Yale finance professor Robert J. Shiller argues that other factors might be partially able to explain the Milgram experiments:

[People] have learned that when experts tell them something is all right, it probably is, even if it does not seem so. (In fact, the experimenter was indeed correct: it was all right to continue giving the "shocks"—even though most of the subjects did not suspect the reason.)

In a 2006 experiment, a computerized avatar was used in place of the learner receiving electrical shocks. Although the participants administering the shocks were aware that the learner was unreal, the experimenters reported that participants responded to the situation physiologically "as if it were real".

Another explanation of Milgram's results invokes belief perseverance as the underlying cause. What "people cannot be counted on is to realize that a seemingly benevolent authority is in fact malevolent, even when they are faced with overwhelming evidence which suggests that this authority is indeed malevolent. Hence, the underlying cause for the subjects' striking conduct could well be conceptual, and not the alleged 'capacity of man to abandon his humanity ... as he merges his unique personality into larger institutional structures."'

This last explanation receives some support from a 2009 episode of the BBC science documentary series Horizon, which involved replication of the Milgram experiment. Of the twelve participants, only three refused to continue to the end of the experiment. Speaking during the episode, social psychologist Clifford Stott discussed the influence that the idealism of scientific inquiry had on the volunteers. He remarked: "The influence is ideological. It's about what they believe science to be, that science is a positive product, it produces beneficial findings and knowledge to society that are helpful for society. So there's that sense of science is providing some kind of system for good."

Building on the importance of idealism, some recent researchers suggest the "engaged followership" perspective. Based on an examination of Milgram's archive, in a recent study, social psychologists Alexander Haslam, Stephen Reicher and Megan Birney, at the University of Queensland, discovered that people are less likely to follow the prods of an experimental leader when the prod resembles an order. However, when the prod stresses the importance of the experiment for science (i.e. "The experiment requires you to continue"), people are more likely to obey. The researchers suggest the perspective of "engaged followership": that people are not simply obeying the orders of a leader, but instead are willing to continue the experiment because of their desire to support the scientific goals of the leader and because of a lack of identification with the learner.

A neuroscientific study found that with a virtual "learner", with subjects informed beforehand that the image they would see receiving shocks was not a real person, watching this virtual learner receive electric shocks did not activate the areas typically activated with empathic response.

== Replications and variations ==
=== Milgram's variations ===
In Obedience to Authority: An Experimental View (1974), Milgram describes 19 variations of his experiment, some of which had not been previously reported.

Several experiments varied the distance between the participant (teacher) and the learner. Generally, when the participant was physically closer to the learner, the participant's compliance decreased. In the variation where the learner's physical immediacy was closest—where the participant had to hold the learner's arm onto a shock plate—30 percent of participants completed the experiment. The participant's compliance also decreased if the experimenter was physically farther away (Experiments 1–4). For example, in Experiment 2, where participants received telephonic instructions from the experimenter, compliance decreased to 21 percent. Some participants deceived the experimenter by pretending to continue the experiment.

In Experiment 8, an all-female contingent was used; previously, all participants had been men. Obedience did not significantly differ, though the women communicated experiencing higher levels of stress.

Experiment 10 took place in a modest office in Bridgeport, Connecticut, purporting to be the commercial entity "Research Associates of Bridgeport" without apparent connection to Yale University, to eliminate the university's prestige as a possible factor influencing the participants' behavior. In those conditions, obedience dropped to 47.5 percent, though the difference was not statistically significant.

Milgram also combined the effect of authority with that of conformity. In those experiments, the participant was joined by one or two additional "teachers" (also actors, like the "learner"). The behavior of the participants' peers strongly affected the results. In Experiment 17, when two additional teachers refused to comply, only four of 40 participants continued in the experiment. In Experiment 18, the participant performed a subsidiary task (reading the questions via microphone or recording the learner's answers) with another "teacher" who complied fully. In that variation, 37 of 40 continued with the experiment.

In addition to these procedural variations, Milgram's work also illuminates the psychological processes highlighting obedience. Participants were observed frequently entering an "agentic state," considering themselves as mere instruments executing the experimenter's will and therefore weakening personal responsibility. This shift was coupled with marked psychological evidence by nervous laughter, sweating, and internal conflict—which emphasizes the tension between hierarchical compliance and individual ethical standards. Such theoretical insights laid the basement for contemporary models of destructive obedience by revealing how authoritative contexts can reshape perceptions of agency and culpability.

In May 1962, Milgram ran another variation of his experiment: the Relationship Condition (RC). In the RC, participants were required to bring a friend, with one becoming the teacher and the other the learner. Just three of the twenty pairs of friends in the study delivered each shock. Compared to the original experiment, the RC's 15% completion rate was a whole 50% lower. Not only did most teachers disobey, but 80 percent did so before the relatively low 195-volt switch, (though most continued passed their friends and loved one's initial protests at 150 volts).

=== Replications ===
A virtual replication of the experiment, with an avatar serving as the learner

Around the time of the release of Obedience to Authority in 1973–1974, a version of the experiment was conducted at La Trobe University in Australia. As reported by Perry in her 2012 book Behind the Shock Machine, some of the participants experienced long-lasting psychological effects, possibly due to the lack of proper debriefing by the experimenter.

In 2002, the British artist Rod Dickinson created The Milgram Re-enactment, an exact reconstruction of parts of the original experiment, including the uniforms, lighting, and rooms used. An audience watched the four-hour performance through one-way glass windows. A video of this performance was first shown at the CCA Gallery in Glasgow in 2002.

A partial replication of the experiment was staged by British illusionist Derren Brown and broadcast on UK's Channel 4 in The Heist (2006).

Another partial replication of the experiment was conducted by Jerry M. Burger in 2006 and broadcast on the Primetime series Basic Instincts. Burger noted that "current standards for the ethical treatment of participants clearly place Milgram's studies out of bounds." In 2009, Burger was able to receive approval from the institutional review board by modifying several of the experimental protocols, including halting the experiment after the 150-volt switch and having the learner directly tell the participant within a few seconds of the end of the experiment that they had not received any shocks. Burger found obedience rates virtually identical to those reported by Milgram in 1961–62, even while meeting current ethical regulations of informing participants. In addition, half the replication participants were female, and their rate of obedience was virtually identical to that of the male participants. Burger also included a condition in which participants first saw another participant refuse to continue. However, participants in this condition obeyed at the same rate as participants in the base condition.

In the 2010 French documentary Le Jeu de la Mort (The Game of Death), researchers recreated the Milgram experiment with an added critique of reality television by presenting the scenario as a game show pilot. Volunteers were given €40 and told that they would not win any money from the game, as this was only a trial. Only 16 of 80 "contestants" (teachers) chose to end the game before delivering the highest-voltage punishment.

The experiment was performed on Dateline NBC on an episode airing April 25, 2010.

The Discovery Channel aired the "How Evil are You?" segment of Curiosity on October 30, 2011. The episode was hosted by Eli Roth, who produced results similar to the original Milgram experiment, though the highest-voltage punishment used was 165 volts, rather than 450 volts. Roth added a segment in which a second person (an actor) in the room would defy the authority ordering the shocks, finding more often than not, the subjects would stand up to the authority figure in this case.

Another replication is the Hofling hospitial experiment from 1966, they tested obedience in hospitials. An unknown doctor called 22 nurses and told them to give an overdose of a fictional drug. 21 nurses were prepared to give an overdose but a hidden observer stopped them. This experiment was a repeat experiment of Milgrims university laboratory

=== Other variations ===
Charles Sheridan at the University of Missouri and Richard King at the University of California, Berkeley hypothesized that some of Milgram's subjects may have suspected that the victim was faking, so they repeated the experiment with a real victim: a "cute, fluffy puppy" that was given real, albeit apparently harmless, electric shocks. Their findings were similar to those of Milgram: Seven out of 13 of the male subjects and all 13 of the female subjects obeyed throughout. Many subjects showed high levels of distress during the experiment and some openly wept. In addition, Sheridan and King found that the duration for which the shock button was pressed decreased as the shocks got higher, meaning that for higher shock levels, subjects were more hesitant.

Another variation by psychologist Don Mixon in the early 1970s tested his theory that vagueness played a key role in the initial Milgram results. The maximum shock in the original experiment and all subsequent replications are simply labeled "XXX" as opposed to "lethal". He designed a replication of the experiment where it was implied that the shocks could be dangerous and cause harm to the learner saying, "The learner's health is irrelevant." Mixon found that obedience rates fell to a very low percentage.

== Media depictions ==
- Obedience to Authority (ISBN 978-0061765216) is Milgram's own account of the experiment, written for a mass audience.
- Obedience is a black-and-white film of the experiment, shot by Milgram himself. It is distributed by Alexander Street Press.
- The Tenth Level was a fictionalized 1975 CBS television drama about the experiment, featuring William Shatner and Ossie Davis.
- Henri Verneuil 's I as in Icarus (1979) has a lengthy 15-min scene replicating Milgram's experiment
- Peter Gabriel's 1986 album So features the song "We Do What We're Told (Milgram's 37)" based on the experiment and its results.
- Batch '81 is a 1982 Filipino film that features a scene based on the Milgram experiment.
- Atrocity is a 2005 film re-enactment of the Milgram Experiment.
- The Heist, a 2006 TV special by Derren Brown, features a reenactment of the Milgram experiment.
- Dar Williams wrote the song "Buzzer" about the experiment for her 2008 album Promised Land.
- Fallout: New Vegas, a 2010 video game published by Bethesda Softworks plays verbal prods told by the experimenter inside a death chamber in Vault 11.
- "Authority" is an episode of Law & Order: Special Victims Unit inspired by the Milgram experiment.
- Experimenter, a 2015 film about Milgram, by Michael Almereyda, was screened to favorable reactions at the 2015 Sundance Film Festival.
- Ted satirically depicts and cites the Milgram Experiment in one episode as Ted prods drunk partygoers to celebrate the invasion of Poland.
- The Milgram Project is a Japanese interactive music project from Deco*27 and Yamanaka Takuya. As the name implies, it is directly inspired by the real-life experiment.
- The experiments play prominently in the novel "The Learners" (2008) by Chip Kidd.
- Bones, the 2005 crime procedural, has an entire episode (Season 10, Episode 9) centered around a modern recreation of the experiment.

== See also ==
- Argument from authority
- Authority bias
- Acali Experiment
- Banality of evil
- Belief perseverance
- Graduated electronic decelerator
- Hofling hospital experiment
- Law of Due Obedience
- Little Eichmanns
- Moral disengagement
- Ordinary Men
- Social influence
- Stanford prison experiment
- Superior orders
- The Third Wave (experiment)
- Unethical human experimentation in the United States

== General and cited references ==
- Blass, Thomas (2004). The Man Who Shocked the World: The Life and Legacy of Stanley Milgram. Basic Books. ISBN 978-0-7382-0399-7.
- Levine, Robert V. (July–August 2004). "Milgram's Progress". American Scientist. Archived from the original on February 26, 2015. Book review of The Man Who Shocked the World
- Milgram, Stanley (1974). Obedience to Authority; An Experimental View. Harper & Row. ISBN 978-0-06-131983-9.
- Miller, Arthur G. (1986). The obedience experiments: A case study of controversy in social science. New York: Praeger.
- Ofgang, Erik (May 22, 2018). "Revisiting the Milgram Obedience Experiment conducted at Yale". New Haven Register. Archived from the original on July 14, 2019.
- Parker, Ian (Autumn 2000). "Obedience". Granta (71). Archived from the original on December 7, 2008. Includes an interview with one of Milgram's volunteers, and discusses modern interest in, and scepticism about, the experiment.
- Tarnow, Eugen (October 2000). "Towards the Zero Accident Goal: Assisting the First Officer Monitor and Challenge Captain Errors". Journal of Aviation/Aerospace Education & Research. 10 (1). Archived from the original on January 13, 2012.
- Wu, William (June 2003). "Compliance: The Milgram Experiment". Practical Psychology. Archived from the original on April 21, 2007.
