= Maximization (psychology) =

Maximization is a style of decision-making characterized by seeking the best option through an exhaustive search through alternatives. It is contrasted with satisficing, in which individuals evaluate options until they find one that is "good enough".

== Definition ==
The distinction between "maximizing" and "satisficing" was first made by Herbert A. Simon in 1956. Simon noted that although fields like economics posited maximization or "optimizing" as the rational method of making decisions, humans often lack the cognitive resources or the environmental affordances to maximize. Simon instead formulated an approach known as bounded rationality, which he also referred to as satisficing. This approach was taken to be adaptive and, indeed, necessary, given our cognitive limitations. Thus, satisficing was taken to be a universal of human cognition.

Although Simon's work on bounded rationality was influential and can be seen as the origin of behavioral economics, the distinction between maximizing and satisficing gained new life 40 years later in psychology. Schwartz, Ward, Monterosso, Lyubomirsky, White, and Lehman (2002) defined maximization as an individual difference, arguing that some people were more likely than others to engage in a comprehensive search for the best option. Thus, instead of conceptualizing satisficing as a universal principle of human cognitive abilities, Schwartz et al. demonstrated that some individuals were more likely than others to display this style of decision-making.

Based on the work of Schwartz et al. (2002), much of the literature on maximization has defined maximization as comprising three major components:

- High standards (wanting the best option)
- Alternative search (engaging in a process of examining all the options)
- Decision difficulty (frustration with making choices)

Since these components were identified, the majority of the research on maximization has focused on which of these components are relevant (or most relevant) to the definition of maximizing. Researchers have variously argued that decision difficulty is irrelevant to defining maximizing, that high standards is the only relevant component, and that high standards is the only irrelevant component. Many of these attempts to define maximizing have resulted in the creation of new psychological scales to measure the trait.

Recently, in a theoretical paper Cheek and Schwartz (2016) proposed a two-component model of maximization, defining maximization as the goal of choosing the best option, pursued by the strategy of searching exhaustively through alternatives. Along similar lines, Hughes and Scholer (2017) proposed that researchers could differentiate between the goals and strategies of maximizers. However, they argued that the high standards goal is central to the definition of maximizing, but that some maximizers engage in adaptive or maladaptive strategies in order to pursue that goal. They showed that individuals with high standards could be distinguished by the use of the alternative search strategy, and that this strategy in particular predicted more negative emotions on a decision task.

== Outcomes ==
Initial research on maximizing showed uniformly negative outcomes associated with chronic maximizing tendencies. Such tendencies were associated with lower happiness, self-esteem, and life satisfaction; with greater depression and regret; with lower satisfaction with choices; with greater perfectionism; and with greater decision-making confusion, commitment anxiety, and rumination. One study by Iyengar, Wells, and Schwartz (2006) tracked job seekers and found that although maximizers were able to find jobs with starting salaries 20% higher than satisficers, they were less satisfied with both the job search process and the job they were about to start. Thus, although maximizers were able to find objectively better options, they ended up subjectively worse off as a result.

However, as disagreement over the definition of maximizing grew, research began to show diverging effects: some negative, some neutral, and some positive. Diab, Gillespie, and Highhouse (2008), for example, contested that maximizing actually was not related to lower life satisfaction, and was not related to indecisiveness, avoidance, or neuroticism. Other studies showed maximizing to be associated with higher self-efficacy, optimism, and intrinsic motivation; and with higher life satisfaction and positive affect.

Much of this disagreement can ultimately be ascribed to the different scales that were created to measure maximizing. But research on the three components mentioned above (high standards, alternative search, and decision difficulty) found that these components themselves predicted differing outcomes. High standards has generally shown little association with negative outcomes, and evidence of association with positive outcomes. In contrast, alternative search and decision difficulty have shown much stronger associations with the negative outcomes listed above. Thus, the question of whether maximizing is adaptive or maladaptive may ultimately depend on which of these components one sees as essential to the definition of maximizing itself.

== Related psychological constructs ==
Limited research exists on other psychological constructs to which maximizing is related. However, several studies have shown maximizing to be associated with perfectionism, and Nenkov et al. (2008) qualified this relationship as being true primarily for the high standards component. Some research has also linked maximizing to high need for cognition, again primarily with the high standards component. Finally, research examining the association between maximizing and personality dimensions of the Big Five personality model have found high standards to be associated with high conscientiousness and decision difficulty with low conscientiousness. Alternative search has also been associated with high neuroticism, and high standards has been associated with high openness to experience.

== Scales used to measure ==
Given the disagreement over the definition of maximizing, as well as attempts to increase the reliability of existing measures, several scales have been created to measure maximization. The list below identifies the name of the scale, as well as the components it measures:

- Maximization Scale (MS): High standards, alternative search, decision difficulty
- Maximizing Tendencies Scale (MTS): Unidimensional, but primarily correlated with high standards and alternative search
- Lai's maximizing scale: High standards and alternative search
- Maximizing Inventory (MI): Alternative search, decision difficulty, as well as a separate subscale measuring satisficing
- Revised MS and MTS: Same components as the original scales above

Cheek and Schwartz (2016) reviewed the literature on the measurement of maximization and proposed that researchers interested in studying individual differences in maximization should measure two constructs: the maximization goal and the maximization strategy. They recommended that researchers use the 7-item Maximizing Tendency Scale published by Dalal et al. (2015) to measure the maximization goal. They also tentatively recommended that researchers use the alternative search subscale of the Maximization Inventory, but noted that future research should continue to refine the measurement of the maximization strategy given psychometric concerns.

== See also ==
- Decision-making
- Decision theory
- Homo economicus
- Overchoice
- Perfect is the enemy of good
- Principle of good enough
- Rational agent
- Satisficing
- Utility maximization problem
