= Buyer's remorse =

Sense of regret after having made a purchase

Buyer's remorse is the sense of regret after having made a purchase. It is frequently associated with the purchase of an expensive item such as a vehicle or real estate.

Buyer's remorse is thought to stem from cognitive dissonance, specifically post-decision dissonance, that arises when a person must make a difficult decision, such as a heavily invested purchase between two similarly appealing alternatives. Factors that affect buyer's remorse may include the resources invested, the involvement of the purchaser, whether the purchase is compatible with the purchaser's goals, and feelings encountered post-purchase that include regret.

== Causes ==
The remorse may be caused by various factors, such as: the person purchased a product now rather than waiting, the item was purchased in an ethically unsound way, the property was purchased on borrowed money, the purchased object was something that would not be acceptable to others, or the purchased object was something that the buyer later questions the value and need of.

In the phase before purchasing, a prospective buyer often feels positive emotions associated with a purchase (desire, a sense of heightened possibilities, and an anticipation of the enjoyment that will accompany using the product, for example); afterwards, having made the purchase, they are more fully able to experience the negative aspects: all the opportunity costs of the purchase, and a reduction in purchasing power.

Also, before the purchase, the buyer has a full array of options, including not purchasing; afterwards, their options have been reduced to:

- continuing with the purchase, surrendering all alternatives
- renouncing the purchase

Buyer's remorse can also be caused or increased by worrying that other people may later question the purchase or claim to know better alternatives.

The remorse associated with some extreme shopping activity may be, again, a sign of some deeper disquiet. However, normal "buyer's remorse" should not be confused with the complex emotional dynamics of "shopaholic" behavior, just as a binge on a special occasion should not be confused with a serious eating disorder such as bulimia.

=== Cognitive dissonance ===
The phenomenon of buyer's remorse has been generally associated with the psychological theory of cognitive dissonance, a state of psychological discomfort when at least two elements of cognition are in opposition, and which motivates the person to appease it by changing how they think about the situation. Buyer's remorse is an example of post-decision dissonance, where a person is stressed by a made decision and seeks to decrease their discomfort. The buyer may change their behavior, their feelings, their knowledge about the world (what they thought the purchased item would be like), or even their knowledge of themselves. The more resources such as money, time, and cognitive resources that are invested into making a purchase, the more likely the buyer will experience buyer's remorse or psychological discomfort.

Psychologists have focused on three main elements that are related to cognitive dissonance and buyer's remorse. They are: effort, responsibility, and commitment. Effort is the resources invested in a purchase (material, intellectual, psychological, and others) and effort is directly related to the importance of the purchase. Purchases that require high amounts of effort but do not bear high rewards are likely to lead to buyer's remorse. Responsibility refers to the fact that the purchase is done out of free will. Buyers that have no choice on the purchase will be less likely to feel dissonance because it was not of their own volition. Commitment refers to the continuing of an action. The purchase of an automobile has high commitment because the car must usually be driven for a long duration. Purchases with higher commitment will lead to more buyer's remorse. Low rewards matched with these three conditions will most likely result in buyer's remorse via cognitive dissonance. The buyer feels anxiety and psychological discomfort because their behavior (the purchase of the item) does not match their attitude (their expectation of the purchased item).

The following scale was developed by Sweeney, Hausknecht, and Soutar in a study to investigate three elements (one emotional, two cognitive) of buyer's remorse.

Elements of cognitive dissonance (22 Items)
	After I bought this product:
Emotional	I was in despair
Emotional	I resented it
Emotional	I felt disappointed with myself
Emotional	I felt scared
Emotional	I felt hollow
Emotional	I felt angry
Emotional	I felt uneasy
Emotional	I felt I'd let myself down
Emotional	I felt annoyed
Emotional	I felt frustrated
Emotional	I was in pain
Emotional	I felt depressed
Emotional	I felt furious with myself
Emotional	I felt sick
Emotional	I was in agony
Wisdom of purchase	I wonder if I really need this product
Wisdom of purchase	I wonder whether I should have bought anything at all
Wisdom of purchase	I wonder if I have made the right choice
Wisdom of purchase	I wonder if I have done the right thing in buying this product
Concern over deal	I wondered if I'd been fooled
Concern over deal	I wondered if they had spun me a lie
Concern over deal	I wondered whether there was something wrong with the deal I got

There may be a duality of attitudes that explain how a person may be satisfied with their purchase but have the intention to never repeat the purchase. For example, a husband who takes his wife to the most expensive restaurant in town for their anniversary only to find that the food and service does not meet his expectations might still be satisfied with his decision to go to the restaurant but have the intention to never return. In this extension of cognitive dissonance, the duality of satisfaction and intention are separate phenomena within buyer's remorse.

== Involvement ==
In social psychology, "involvement" describes the effort, investment, and commitment in purchases. Involvement is often coupled with cognitive dissonance to explain buyer's remorse. In most cases, buyer's remorse resulting from a purchase that demands high involvement and results in cognitive dissonance is, all else (most notably nominal purchase price) being equal, harder to overcome than is buyer's remorse resulting from a purchase that demands low involvement and results in cognitive dissonance. This phenomenon is a result of the brain's instinctive (and rational) treatment of the transaction costs involved in acquiring a product as part of the purchase price of that product: The more involvement that a purchase requires or the purchaser puts in, the more dissonance or psychological discomfort the buyer will experience if dissatisfied with the purchase, just as if the purchaser had spent more "on paper" (i.e., paid a higher nominal price) for the product.

Studies investigating the link between cognitive dissonance and impulse buying have shown that impulse buyers experience less cognitive dissonance when they are disappointed with their purchase. The main explanation for this is that impulse buyers go into the purchase already without high expectations. Another possible explanation, at least among more sophisticated buyers, is that persons who are dissatisfied with a purchase that they made on impulse may blame that dissatisfaction at least in part on their own failure to thoroughly consider whether the product will satisfy their prior expectations even if it performs as advertised, thus blaming any discrepancy at least in part on themselves (via their own impulsivity) rather than on the purchased product (via any sort of difference between its promised and its actual attributes and/or performance).

== Paradox of choice ==
The paradox of choice is a theory by American psychologist Barry Schwartz claiming that, after a certain threshold is reached, an increase in the number of choices will cause a significant amount of psychological distress. This distress, according to Professor Schwartz, can manifest itself in many ways. One way is through buyer's remorse. The theory states that buyer's remorse is created through increasing opportunity costs associated with increased choices. Opportunity costs associated with alternative choices compound and create strong feelings of dissonance and remorse.

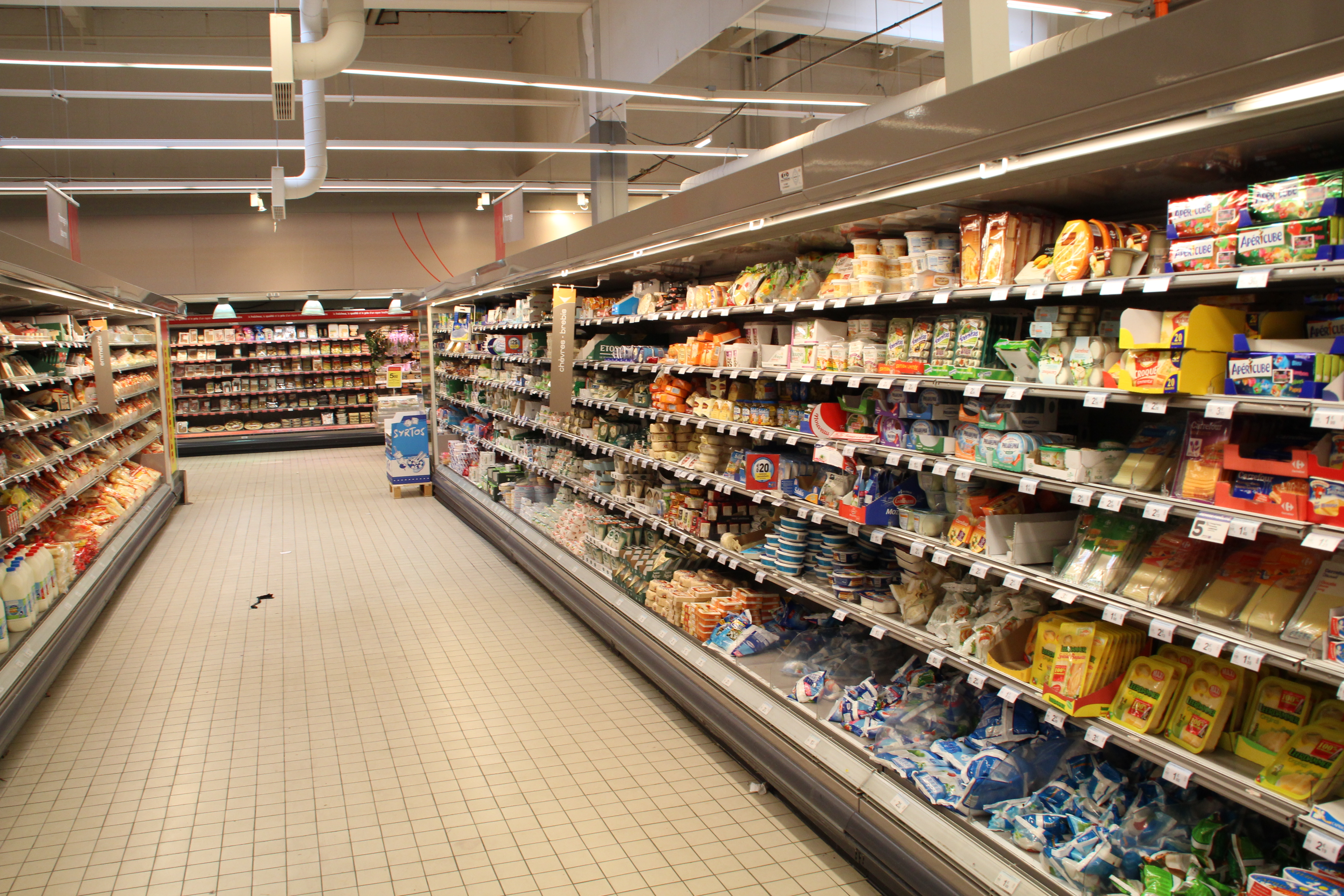
A typical dairy section in a supermarket, demonstrating the large number of choices present

As the number of choices increase, it is easier to imagine a different choice that may have been better than the one selected. The constant comparison to one's expectations induces regret, which reduces the satisfaction of any decision, even if it fills the individual's needs. When there are many alternatives to consider, it is easy to imagine the attractive features of rejected choices and there is a decrease in overall satisfaction.

Consider the number of choices in a simple supermarket. There are likely to be many different options for a single type of product. With so many to choose from, the customer might expect that one of the available options must be perfect for their needs and will have no drawbacks. This leads to expectations rarely being met, a significant psychological issue. In the example of a supermarket, buying the wrong product may not be a significant mistake. For more involved decisions, the consequences of a wrong decision are significant.

== Reducing ==
Choice-supportive bias leads to an increased liking of one's choices, including purchases. This seems to contradict the concept of buyer's remorse. However, this choice enhancement can collapse when presented with even minor indication that the wrong choice was made. While initial positivity towards a decision is greater for more difficult decisions, this positivity also has greater vulnerability to evidence of an incorrect choice. This effect is larger when the purchaser is more involved in the decision. However, buyer's remorse can be reduced by post-purchase confirmation, though post-purchase communication may aggravate a buyer's discomfort if the purchase did not meet the buyer's predominant goals. Indeed, if the purchase meets an individual's goals there will be less post-purchase dissonance which means there will be less remorse and greater decision satisfaction.

=== Marketing implications ===
Buyer's remorse is a powerful experience for consumers. For years, marketers have been attempting to reduce buyer's remorse through many different methods. One specific technique employed by marketers is the inclusion of a coupon towards a future purchase at the point of sale. This has many benefits for both the consumer and retailer. First, the consumer is more likely to return to the store with the coupon, which will result in a higher percentage of repeat customers. Each successive time a purchase is made and is deemed satisfactory, buyer's remorse is less likely to be experienced. Customers can justify their purchases with product performance.

Another technique used is the money back guarantee, a guarantee from the retailer that the product will meet the customer's needs or the customer is entitled to a full refund. This technique is highly successful at lessening buyer's remorse because it immediately makes the decision a changeable one. The unchangeability of an "all-sales-final" purchase can lead to a larger amount of psychological discomfort at the point of the decision. This makes the stakes higher, and poor choices will cause significant buyer's remorse.

In additions, legislation exists in various parts of the world enforcing the right to a cooling-off period, during which contracts may be cancelled and goods returned for any reason, for a full refund.

== See also ==
- Analysis paralysis
- Caveat emptor
- Friendly fraud
- Marketing
- Overchoice
- Post-purchase rationalization
- Regret (decision theory)
- Winner's curse
