= Choice =

Deciding between multiple options

A choice is the range of different things from which a being can choose. The arrival at a choice may incorporate motivators and models.

Freedom of choice is generally cherished, whereas a severely limited or artificially restricted choice can lead to discomfort with choosing, and possibly an unsatisfactory outcome. In contrast, a choice with excessively numerous options may lead to confusion, reduced satisfaction, regret of the alternatives not taken, and indifference in an unstructured existence; and the illusion that choosing an object or a course, necessarily leads to the control of that object or course, can cause psychological problems.

== Types ==
One can distinguish four or five main types of decisions, although they can be expressed in different ways. Brian Tracy breaks them down into:

1. command decisions, which can only be made by you, as the "Commander in Chief", or owner of a company
2. delegated decisions, which may be made by anyone. Decisions for example can be: The color of the bike shed can be delegated, as the decision must be made but the choice is inconsequential.
3. avoided decisions, where the outcome could be so severe that the choice should not be made, as the consequences can not be recovered if the wrong choice is made. This will most likely result in negative actions, such as death.
4. "No-brainer" decisions, where the choice is so obvious that only one choice can reasonably be made.

A fifth type, however, (or fourth if "avoided" and "no-brainer" decisions are combined as one type), is the collaborative decision, made in consultation with, and by agreement of others. Collaborative Decision Making revolutionized air-traffic safety by not deferring to the captain when a lesser crew-member becomes aware of a problem.

Another way of looking at decisions focuses on the thought mechanism used - whether the decision is:

- Rational
- Intuitive
- Recognition-based
- Combination

Recognizing that "type" is an imprecise term, an alternate way to classify types of choices is to look at outcomes and the impacted entity. For example, using this approach three types of choices might be:

- business
- personal
- consumer

Or politicians may choose to support or oppose options based on local, national, or international effects.

As a moral principle, decisions should be made by those most affected by the decision, but this is not normally applied to persons in jail, who might likely make a decision other than to remain in jail. Robert Gates cited this principle in allowing photographs of returning war-dead.

One can distinguish between conscious and unconscious choice. Processes such as brainwashing or other influencing strategies may have the effect of having unconscious choice masquerade as (praiseworthy) conscious choice.

Choices may lead to irreversible or to reversible outcomes; making irreversible choices (existential choices) may reduce choice overload.

== Evaluability in economics ==
When choosing between options one must make judgments about the quality of each option's attributes. For example, if one is choosing between candidates for a job, the quality of relevant attributes such as previous work experience, college or high school GPA, and letters of recommendation will be judged for each option and the decision will likely be based on these attribute judgments. However, each attribute has a different level of evaluability, that is, the extent to which one can use information from that attribute to make a judgment.

An example of a highly evaluable attribute is the SAT score. It is widely known in the United States that an SAT score below 800 is very bad while an SAT score above 1500 is exceptionally good. Because the distribution of scores on this attribute is relatively well known it is a highly evaluable attribute. Compare the SAT score to a poorly evaluable attribute, such as the number of hours spent doing homework. Most employers would not know what 10,000 hours spent doing homework means because they have no idea of the distribution of scores of potential workers in the population on this attribute.

As a result, evaluability can cause preference reversals between joint and separate evaluations. For example, a 1999 review and theoretical analysis looked at how people choose between options when they are directly compared because they are presented at the same time or when they cannot be compared because one is only given a single option. The canonical example is a hiring decision made about two candidates being hired for a programming job. Subjects in an experiment were asked to give a starting salary to two candidates, Candidate J and Candidate S. However, some viewed both candidates at the same time (joint evaluation), whereas others only viewed one candidate (separate evaluation). Candidate J had experience of 70 KY programs, and a GPA of 2.5, whereas Candidate S had experience of 10 KY programs and a GPA of 3.9. The results showed that in joint evaluation both candidates received roughly the same starting salary from subjects, who apparently thought a low GPA but high experience was approximately equal to a high GPA but low experience. However, in the separate evaluation, subjects paid Candidate S, the one with the high GPA, substantially more money. The explanation for this is that KY programs is an attribute that is difficult to evaluate and thus people cannot base their judgment on this attribute in separate evaluation.

== Number of options and paradox ==
Several research studies in economic psychology have concentrated on examining the variations in individual behavior when confronted with a low versus high choice set size, which refers to the number of available options. A particular area of interest lies in determining whether individuals demonstrate a higher propensity to purchase a product from a larger choice set compared to a smaller one. Currently, the effect of choice set size on the probability of a purchase is unclear. In some cases, large choice set sizes discourage individuals from making a choice and in other cases it either encourages them or has no effect. One study compared the allure of more choice to the tyranny of too much choice. Individuals went virtual shopping in different stores that had a randomly determined set of choices ranging from 4 to 16, with some being good choices and some being bad. Researchers found a stronger effect for the allure of more choice. However, they speculate that due to random assignment of number of choices and goodness of those choices, many of the shops with fewer choices included zero or only one option that was reasonably good, which may have made it easier to make an acceptable choice when more options were available.

There is some evidence that while greater choice has the potential to improve a person's welfare, sometimes there is such a thing as too much choice. For example, in one experiment involving a choice of free soda, individuals explicitly requested to choose from six as opposed to 24 sodas, where the only benefit from the smaller choice set would be to reduce the cognitive burden of the choice. A recent study supports this research, finding that human services workers indicated preferences for scenarios with limited options over extensive-options scenarios. As the number of choices within the extensive-options scenarios increased, the preference for limited options increased as well. Attempts to explain why choice can demotivate someone from a purchase have focuses on two factors. One assumes that perusing a larger number of choices imposes a cognitive burden on the individual. The other assumes that individuals can experience regret if they make a suboptimal choice, and sometimes avoid making a choice to avoid experiencing regret.

Further research has expanded on choice overload, suggesting that there is a paradox of choice. As increasing options are available, three problems emerge. First, there is the issue of gaining adequate information about the choices in order to make a decision. Second, having more choices leads to an escalation of expectation. When there are increased options, people's standards for what is an acceptable outcome rise; in other words, choice "spoils you." Third, with many options available, people may come to believe they are to blame for an unacceptable result because with so many choices, they should have been able to pick the best one. If there is one choice available, and it ends up being disappointing, the world can be held accountable. When there are many options and the choice that one makes is disappointing, the individual is responsible.

However, a recent meta-analysis of the literature on choice overload calls such studies into question. In many cases, researchers have found no effect of choice set size on people's beliefs, feelings, and behavior. Indeed, overall, the effect of "too many options" is minimal at best.

While it might be expected that it is preferable to keep one's options open, research has shown that having the opportunity to revise one's decisions leaves people less satisfied with the decision outcome. A recent study found that participants experienced higher regret after having made a reversible decision. The results suggest that reversible decisions cause people to continue to think about the still relevant choice options, which might increase dissatisfaction with the decision and regret.

Individual personality plays a significant role in how individuals deal with large choice set sizes. Psychologists have developed a personality test that determines where an individual lies on the satisfier spectrum. A maximizer is one who always seeks the very best option from a choice set, and may anguish after the choice is made as to whether it was indeed the best. Satisfiers may set high standards but are content with a good choice, and place less priority on making the best choice. Due to this different approach to decision-making, maximizers are more likely to avoid making a choice when the choice set size is large, probably to avoid the anguish associated with not knowing whether their choice was optimal. One study looked at whether the differences in choice satisfaction between the two are partially due to a difference in willingness to commit to one's choices. It found that maximizers reported a stronger preference for retaining the ability to revise choices. Additionally, after making a choice to buy a poster, satisfiers offered higher ratings of their chosen poster and lower ratings of the rejected alternatives. Maximizers, however, were less likely to change their impressions of the posters after making their choice which left them less satisfied with their decision.

Maximizers are less happy in life, perhaps due to their obsession with making optimal choices in a society where people are frequently confronted with choice. One study found that maximizers reported significantly less life satisfaction, happiness, optimism, and self-esteem, and significantly more regret and depression, than did satisfiers. In regards to buying products, maximizers were less satisfied with consumer decisions and were more regretful. They were also more likely to engage in social comparison, where they analyze their relative social standing among their peers, and to be more affected by social comparisons in which others appeared to be in higher standing than them. For example, maximizers who saw their peer solve puzzles faster than themselves expressed greater doubt about their own abilities and showed a larger increase in negative mood. On the other hand, people who refrain from taking better choices through drugs or other forms of escapism tend to be much happier in life.

Others say that there is never too much choice and that there is a difference between happiness and satisfaction: a person who tries to find better decisions will often be dissatisfied, but not necessarily unhappy since his attempts at finding better choices did improve his lifestyle (even if it wasn't the best decision he will continually try to incrementally improve the decisions he takes).

Choice architecture is the process of encouraging people to make good choices through grouping and ordering the decisions in a way that maximizes successful choices and minimizes the number of people who become so overwhelmed by complexity that they abandon the attempt to choose. Generally, success is improved by presenting the smaller or simpler choices first, and by choosing and promoting sensible default options.

== Relationship to identity ==
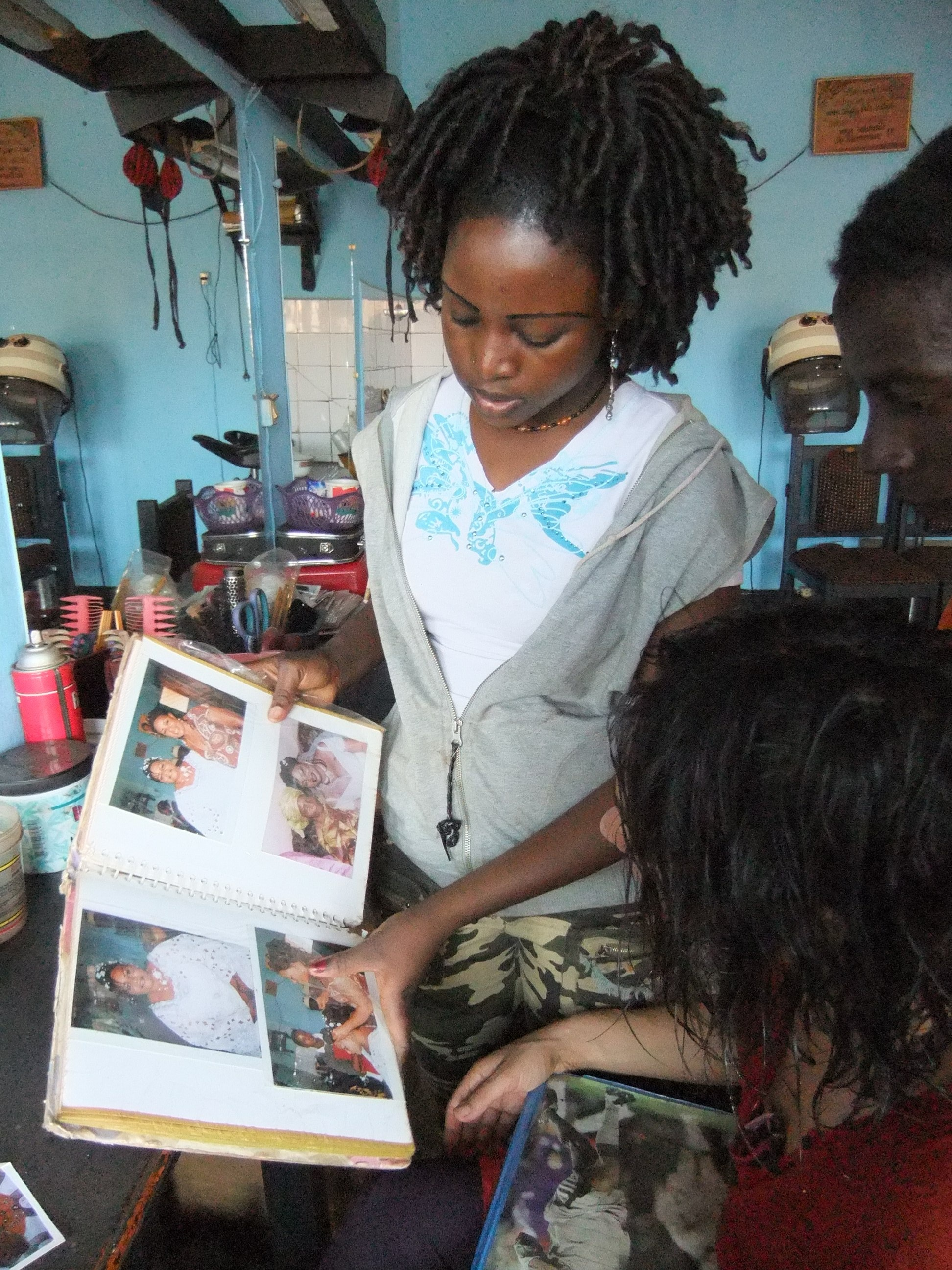
Choosing a hairstyle.

Certain choices, as personal preferences, can be central to expressing one's concept of self-identity or values. In general, the more utilitarian an item, the less the choice says about a person's self-concept. Purely functional items, such as a fire extinguisher, may be chosen solely for function alone, but non-functional items, such as music, clothing fashions, or home decorations, may instead be chosen to express a person's concept of self-identity or associated values.

A 2014 review of previous studies on choice investigated how synchronic (changing) and diachronic (persisting) identity can influence choices and decisions that an individual makes and especially in consumer choices. The synchronic dimension of identity is more about the various parts of an identity and how these shifting aspects can change behavior. The diachronic dimension of identity is how a person’s identity persists and is the same and how they understand an object in relation to their identity. They found that stereotypes in concepts like gender norms play a big role in decision-making and that this might stem from significant historical beliefs in gender roles and identity.

== Attitudes ==
As part of his thinking on choiceless awareness, Jiddu Krishnamurti (1895–1986) pointed out the confusions and bias of exercising choice.

Sophia Rosenfeld analyses critical reactions to choice in her 2014 review of some of the work of Iyengar, Ben-Porath, Greenfield, and Salecl.

A study was conducted that looked into how attitude towards a particular brand would influence choice of a brand as it is being advertised. A picture of running shoes was created to either make the ad look good or bad and participants were asked to choose between four different brands. The attitude toward the add (Aad) shows to have a significant impact on choice of brand as well as the act of buying the brand (AB). This suggests that the attitude one had towards a brand can influence the choice and the intention to buy a particular item.

== Other uses ==
- Animal behaviour: see preference tests (animals)
- Law: the age at which children or young adults can make meaningful and considered choices poses issues for ethics and for jurisprudence
- Mathematics: the binomial coefficient is also known as the choice function
- Politics: a political movement in the United States and United Kingdom which favors the legal availability of abortion calls itself "pro-choice"
- New Zealand English: slang synonym for "cool", "nice" or "good"; e.g. "That's choice!"
- Psychology: see choice theory

== See also ==
- Choice architecture
- Choice feminism
- Decision making software
- Example choice
- Freedom of choice
- Hobson's choice
- Intertemporal choice
- Sheena Iyengar, author of The Art of Choosing
- Neuroscience of free will
- Public choice theory, social choice theory
- Rational choice theory
- The Paradox of Choice: Why More Is Less (book)
- Two-alternative forced choice
- Option
- Will (philosophy)
- Alternative
