= Renata Salecl =

Slovene philosopher

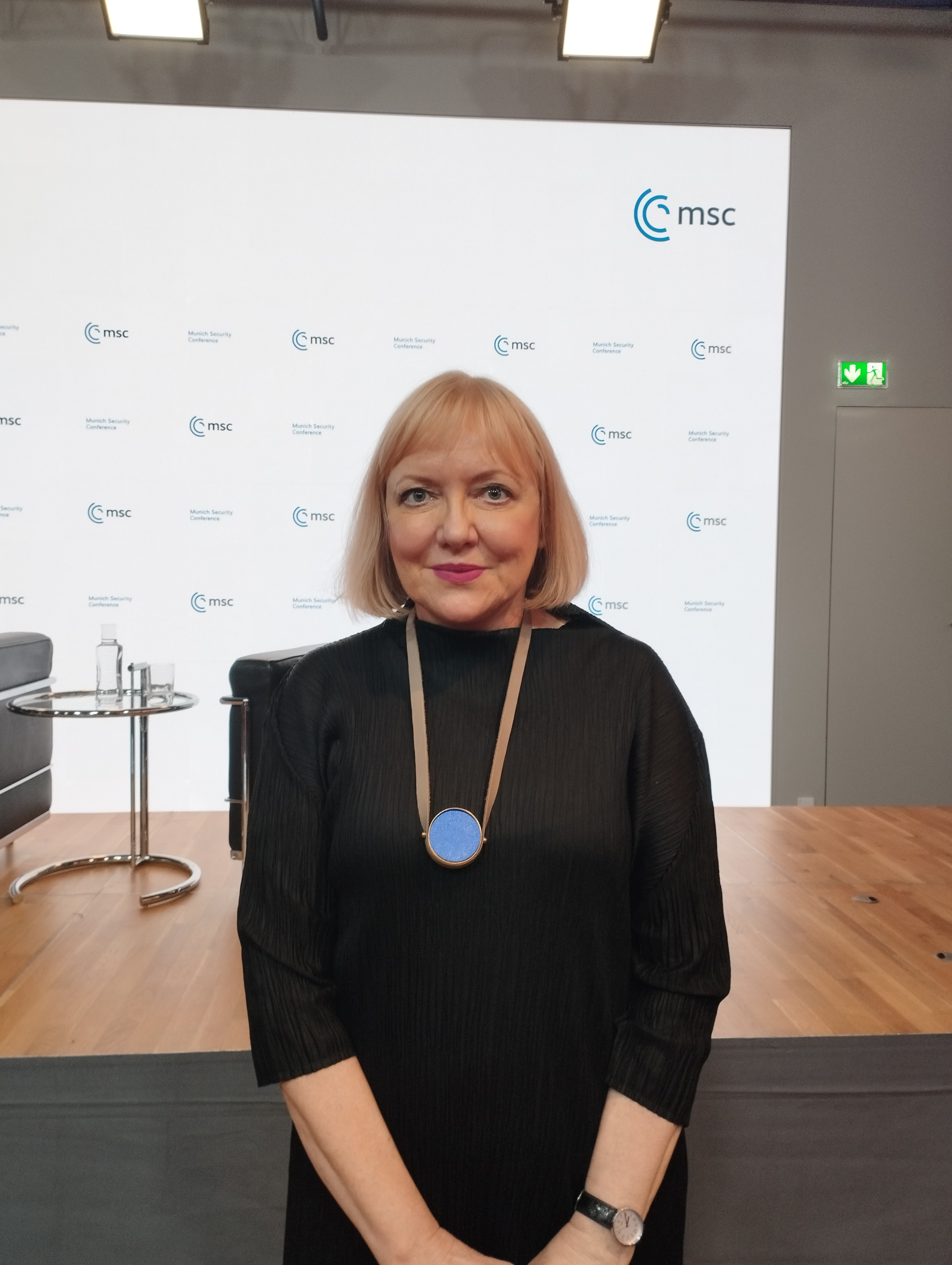
- Renata Salecl at the 2023 Munich Security Conference
- Born: 1962 (age 63–64); Slovenj Gradec, Slovenia, Yugoslavia

Philosophical work
- Era: 20th- / 21st-century philosophy
- Region: Western philosophy
- School: Lacanian Psychoanalysis, Ljubljana school of psychoanalysis, Critical legal studies
- Main interests: Legal theory, Psychoanalysis, Philosophy

Renata Salecl (born 1962) is a Slovene philosopher, sociologist and legal theorist. She is a senior researcher at the Institute of Criminology, Faculty of Law at the University of Ljubljana, and holds a professorship at Birkbeck College, University of London. She has been a visiting professor at the London School of Economics, lecturing on the topic of emotions and law. Every year she lectures at Benjamin N. Cardozo School of Law (New York), on Psychoanalysis and Law, and she has also been teaching courses on neuroscience and law. Since 2012 she has been a visiting professor at the Department of Social Science, Health and Medicine at King's College London. Her books have been translated into fifteen languages. In 2017, she was elected as a member of the Slovene Academy of Science.

== Life and civic activism ==
In the 1980s Salecl became associated with the intellectual circle known as the Ljubljana school of psychoanalysis, which combined the study of Lacanian psychoanalysis with the philosophic legacy of German idealism and critical theory. In the late 1980s she became active in the left liberal opposition to the ruling Slovenian Communist party. In the first democratic elections in Slovenia in April 1990 she unsuccessfully ran for the Slovenian Parliament on the list of the Alliance of Socialist Youth of Slovenia - Liberal Party. After 1990 she left party politics but remained active in public life, especially as a commentator.

She was married to the Slovenian Marxist–Lacanian philosopher Slavoj Žižek. They have one son.

== Work ==
She studied philosophy at the University of Ljubljana, graduating with a thesis on Michel Foucault's theory of power under the supervision of the Marxist philosopher Božidar Debenjak. From 1986, she started working as a researcher at the Institute of Criminology at the Faculty of Law in Ljubljana, In 1991, she obtained a PhD at the Department of Sociology at the University of Ljubljana under the supervision of Drago Braco Rotar. Her work focuses on bringing together law, criminology and psychoanalysis. She has worked on the theories of punishment, and on the analysis of the relation between late capitalist insistence on choice and the increased feelings of anxiety and guilt in post-modern subjects. The book also analyses how matters of choice apply to law and criminology.

Salecl is associated with the critical legal studies movement. She was a Centennial Professor at the department of law at the London School of Economics (LSE) and is now a visiting professor at the LSE's BIOS Centre for the Study of Bioscience, Biomedicine, Biotechnology and Society, and holds a full professorship at the School of Law at Birkbeck College, University of London. She often teaches as visiting professor at Cardozo School of Law in New York. She has been a fellow at the Institute for Advanced Study, Berlin (1997/8), visiting professor at the Humboldt University in Berlin, visiting humanities professor at George Washington University in Washington, DC, and visiting professor at Duke University.

She also writes columns in various European newspapers, including Delo (Ljubljana) and La Vanguardia (Barcelona).

== Awards ==
- In 2010, she was awarded the title of "Slovenian woman scientist of the year". In December of the same year, she was a candidate for a "Slovenian person of the year" by the daily newspaper Delo.
- In 2011, she was named the most successful woman in Slovenia and got the title ONA 365 by the women magazine Ona (English: SHE magazine).

== Selected bibliography ==
=== In English ===
- Salecl, Renata (1994). The spoils of freedom: psychoanalysis and feminism after the fall of socialism. London & New York: Routledge. ISBN 9780415073585.
- Salecl, Renata; & Žižek, Slavoj (1996). Gaze and voice as love objects. Durham, North Carolina: Duke University Press. ISBN 9780822318132.
- Salecl, Renata (1998). (Per)versions of love and hate. London & New York: Verso. ISBN 9781859842362.
- Salecl, Renata (2000). Sexuation. Durham, North Carolina: Duke University Press. ISBN 9780822324379.
- Salecl, Renata (2004). On anxiety. London & New York: Routledge. ISBN 9780203508282.
- Salecl, Renata (2010). The tyranny of choice. London: Profile. ISBN 9781847652263.

=== In Slovene ===
- Salecl, Renata (1993). Zakaj ubogamo oblast? Nadzorovanje, ideologija in ideološke fantazme [Why do we love power? Control, ideology, and ideological phantasms]. Ljubljana: Državna založba Slovenije. ISBN 9788634108538.
- Salecl, Renata; Kobe, Zdravko (2010). Disciplina kot pogoj svobode [Discipline as the condition of freedom]. Ljubljana: Krtina. ISBN 9789612600303.

=== In Spanish ===
Salecl, Renata (2018). Angustia. Buenos Aires: Ediciones Godot. ISBN 9789874086525.

=== Chapters in books ===
- Salecl, Renata (2001), "Cut in the body: from clitoridectomy to body art", in Ahmed, Sara, Stacey, Jackie, Thinking Through the Skin, London: Routledge, pp.21-35, ISBN 978-0415223560.
- Salecl, Renata (2013), "The myth of choice for children and parents: why we deny the harm being caused to our children", in Wild, Jim (ed.), Exploiting childhood: how fast food, material obsession and porn culture are creating new forms of child abuse, London: Jessica Kingsley Publishers, pp. 98–109, ISBN 9780857007421.

== See also ==
- Overchoice
- The Paradox of Choice: Why More Is Less
