= Analysis paralysis =

Overthinking causes

Analysis paralysis (or paralysis by analysis) is a state of an individual or a group in which excessive analysis of a situation cause forward motion or decision-making to become paralyzed, meaning that no solution or course of action is decided upon within a natural time frame. It is one of the results caused by overanalyzing or overthinking a situation. A situation may be deemed too complicated and a decision is never made, or made much too late, due to anxiety that a potentially larger problem may arise. A person may desire a perfect solution, but may fear making a decision that could result in error, while on the way to a better solution. Equally, a person may hold that a superior solution is a short step away, and stall in its endless pursuit, with no concept of diminishing returns. On the opposite end of the time spectrum is the phrase extinct by instinct, which is making a fatal decision based on hasty judgment or a gut reaction.

Analysis paralysis is when the fear of either making an error or forgoing a superior solution outweighs the realistic expectation or potential value of success in a decision made in a timely manner. This imbalance results in suppressed decision-making in an unconscious effort to preserve existing options. An overload of options can overwhelm the situation and cause this "paralysis", rendering one unable to come to a conclusion. It can become a larger problem in critical situations where a decision needs to be reached, but a person is not able to provide a response fast enough, potentially causing a bigger issue than they would have had, had they made a decision.

== History ==
The basic idea has been expressed through narrative a number of times. In one "Aesop's fable" that is recorded even before Aesop's time, The Fox and the Cat, the fox boasts of "hundreds of ways of escaping" while the cat has "only one". When they hear the hounds approaching, the cat scampers up a tree while "the fox in his confusion was caught up by the hounds". The fable ends with the moral, "Better one safe way than a hundred on which you cannot reckon". Related concepts are expressed by the Centipede's dilemma, how unconscious activity is disrupted by conscious thought of it, and by the tale of Buridan's ass, a paradox of rational decision-making with equal options.

In Shakespeare's Hamlet, the main character, Prince Hamlet, is often said to have a mortal flaw of thinking too much, such that his youth and vital energy are "sicklied o'er with the pale cast of thought". Neema Parvini explores some of Hamlet's key decisions in the chapter "'And Reason Panders Will': Another Look at Hamlet's Analysis Paralysis".

Voltaire popularized an old Italian proverb in French in the 1770s, of which an English variant is, "Perfect is the enemy of good", meaning that one might never complete a task if one has decided not to stop until it is perfect: completing the project well is made impossible by striving to complete it perfectly.

"Analysis, paralysis" appeared together in an 1803 pronouncing dictionary and later editions stating how those words are pronounced similarly. The usage of rhyming words can make aphorisms sound more truthful and be more memorable by their usage of the rhyme-as-reason effect and ode mnemonics.

In 1928 at the General Convention of the Episcopal Church, Reverend C. Leslie Glenn, National Secretary for College Work, spoke that the religious collegiate world was at risk of "paralysis by analysis" from being too speculative instead of definitive, needing real work instead of investigations.

During World War II, Winston Churchill, after hearing that certain landing craft designers were spending the majority of their time arguing over design changes, sent this message: "The maxim 'Nothing avails but perfection' may be spelt shorter: 'Paralysis.'"

In 1956, Charles R. Schwartz wrote the article "The Return-on-Investment Concept as a Tool for Decision Making" in Changing Patterns And Concepts In Management stating, "We will do less guessing; avoid the danger of becoming extinct by instinct; and, by the adoption of one uniform evaluation guide, escape succumbing to paralysis by analysis."

In 1965, H. Igor Ansoff wrote the book Corporate Strategy: An Analytic Approach to Business Policy for Growth and Expansion. He used the phrase "paralysis by analysis" in reference to those who used the approach to excess. Ansoff had referenced Schwartz's paper in a couple of his papers.

In a paper published in 1970, based on a speech in 1969 and other works, Silver and Hecker wrote:

The Duke group has used the term "analysis-paralysis" to point out that, if we wait until we have completely answered all the questions and solved all of the problems before training the personnel we need, we will never reach a solution. The insistent demands for further study and extensive evaluation suggested by some may only be a defense by those who do not wish to change or those who fear change.

The Oxford English Dictionary says that the earliest uses of "analysis paralysis" found in The Times were in the 1970s.

== Software development ==
In software development, analysis paralysis typically manifests itself through the waterfall model with exceedingly long phases of project planning, requirements gathering, program design, and data modeling, which can create little or no extra value by those steps and risk many revisions. When extended over too long of a timeframe, such processes tend to emphasize the organizational (i.e., bureaucratic) aspect of the software project, while detracting from its functional (value-creating) portion.

Analysis paralysis can occur when there is a lack of experience on the part of workers such as systems analysts, project managers or software developers, and could be due to a rigid and formal organizational culture. However, according to Ram Charan, indecision in businesses is usually the result of not enough people acting or speaking up about the inefficiencies of the company. Analysis paralysis can also arise from extensive experience or expertise, which serves to increase the number of options and considerations that appear at every decision point.

Analysis paralysis is an example of an anti-pattern. Agile software development methodologies explicitly seek to prevent analysis paralysis, by promoting an iterative work cycle that emphasizes working products over product specifications, but requires buy-in from the full project team. In some instances, Agile software development ends up creating additional confusion in the project in the case where iterative plans are made with no intention on having the team following through.

== Sports ==
Analysis paralysis is a critical problem in athletics. It can be explained in simple terms as "failure to react in response to overthought". A victim of sporting analysis paralysis will frequently think in complicated terms of "what to do next" while contemplating the variety of possibilities, and in doing so exhausts the available time in which to act.

== Games ==
Games provide a microcosm for decision-making where there can be adversaries, hidden or missing information, random events, complex options, and consequences. In this context, analysis paralysis denotes a state where a player is so overwhelmed by the available moves and their implications that the player's turn takes an inordinate amount of time. This can be compounded in a losing position where the player is exhaustively searching for a win or purposely stalling to prevent officially losing the game. The connotation is often pejorative, implying that the slowing of the game diminished the enjoyment by other players. Some games explicitly add time deadlines (e.g. with a chess clock or egg timer). In chess this slowing of play is referred to as Kotov syndrome and, in timed chess matches, can result in time trouble. Good game design can reduce the likelihood of analysis paralysis in gameplay. Game design itself can also be susceptible to analysis paralysis.

== See also ==
- Bounded rationality
- Buyer's remorse
- Criticism
- Decision fatigue
- Decisional balance
- Existential crisis
- Groupthink
- Information overload
- Obsessive–compulsive personality disorder
- Opportunity cost
- Overchoice
- The Paradox of Choice: Why More Is Less
- Perfect is the enemy of good
- Perfectionism
- Regret (decision theory)
- Search cost
- Secretary problem
- Thinking, Fast and Slow
- VUCA
- Wicked problem
- Writer's block
- Yips
