= The Paradox of Choice =

2004 book by Barry Schwartz

The Paradox of Choice – Why More is Less
- Author: Barry Schwartz
- Cover artist: David High & Ralph del Pozzo, High Design, NYC
- Language: English
- Subject: Psychology, Sociology
- Genre: Choice, Decision making
- Publisher: Harper Perennial
- Publication date: 2004 (hardcover); January 18, 2005 (paperback)
- Publication place: United States
- Media type: Print (hardcover, paperback)
- Pages: 304
- ISBN: 0-06-000568-8 (hardcover); 0060005696 (paperback)
- OCLC: 64265862
- Dewey Decimal: 153.8/3
- LC Class: BF611 .S38 2004

The Paradox of Choice – Why More Is Less is a book about overchoice written by American psychologist Barry Schwartz and first published in 2004 by Harper Perennial. In the book, Schwartz argues that eliminating consumer choices can greatly reduce anxiety for shoppers. The book analyzes the behavior of different types of people (in particular, maximizers and satisficers). This book argues that the dramatic explosion in choice—from the mundane to the profound challenges of balancing career, family, and individual needs—has paradoxically become a problem instead of a solution and how our obsession with choice encourages us to seek that which makes us feel worse.

== Summary ==
"Autonomy and freedom of choice are critical to our well being, and choice is critical to freedom and autonomy. Nonetheless, though modern Americans have more choice than any group of people ever has had before, and thus, presumably, more freedom and autonomy, we don't seem to be benefiting from it psychologically". This quote from his book summarises Schwartz's point of view with regards to having too many choices.

== Publication history ==
The Paradox of Choice was published by Harper Perennial and was released in 2004, while the paperback version was released on 18 January 2005.

== Schwartz's thesis ==
Schwartz assembles his argument from a variety of fields of modern psychology that study how happiness is affected by success or failure of goal achievement.

=== When We Choose ===
Schwartz compares the various choices that Americans face in their daily lives by comparing the selection of choices at a supermarket to the variety of classes at an Ivy League college:

There are now several books and magazines devoted to what is called the "voluntary simplicity" movement. Its core idea is that we have too many choices, too many decisions, too little time to do what is really important. ... Taking care of our own "wants" and focusing on what we "want" to do does not strike me as a solution to the problem of too much choice.

Schwartz maintains that it is precisely so that we can focus on our own wants that all of these choices emerged in the first place.

=== How We Choose ===
Schwartz describes that a consumer's strategy for most good decisions will involve these steps:

1. Figure out your goal or goals. The process of goal-setting and decision making begins with the question: "What do I want?" When faced with the choice to pick a restaurant, a CD, or a movie, one makes their choice based upon how one would expect the experience to make them feel, expected utility. Once they have experienced that particular restaurant, CD or movie, their choice will be based upon a remembered utility. To say that you know what you want, therefore, means that these utilities align. Nobel Prize-winning psychologist Daniel Kahneman and his colleagues have shown that what we remember about the pleasurable quality of our past experiences is almost entirely determined by two things: how the experiences felt when they were at their peak (best or worst), and how they felt when they ended.
2. Evaluate the importance of each goal. Daniel Kahneman and Amos Tversky have researched how people make decisions and found a variety of rules of thumb that often lead us astray. Most people give substantial weight to anecdotal evidence, perhaps so much so that it cancels out expert evidence. The researchers called it the availability heuristic describing how we assume that the more available some piece of information is to memory, the more frequently we must have encountered it in the past. Salience will influence the weight we give any particular piece of information.
3. Array the options. Kahneman and Tversky found that personal "psychological accounts" will produce the effect of framing the choice and determining what options are considered as subjects to factor. For example, an evening at a concert could be just one entry in a much larger account, of say a "meeting a potential mate" account. Or it could be part of a more general account such as "ways to spend a Friday night". Just how much an evening at a concert is worth will depend on which account it is a part of.
4. Evaluate how likely each of the options is to meet your goals. People often talk about how "creative accountants can make a corporate balance sheet look as good or bad as they want it to look." In many ways Schwartz views most people as creative accountants when it comes to keeping their own psychological balance sheet.
5. Pick the winning option. Schwartz argues that options are already attached to choices being considered. When the options are not already attached, they are not part of the endowment and choosing them is perceived as a gain. Economist Richard Thaler provides a helpful term sunk costs.
6. Modify goals. Schwartz points out that later, one uses the consequences of their choice to modify their goals, the importance assigned to them, and the way future possibilities are evaluated.

Schwartz relates the ideas of psychologist Herbert A. Simon from the 1950s to the psychological stress that most consumers face today. He notes some important distinctions between, what Simon termed, maximizers and satisficers. A maximizer is similar to a perfectionist, someone who needs to be assured that their every purchase or decision was the best that could be made. The way a maximizer knows for certain is to consider all the alternatives they can imagine. This creates a psychologically daunting task, which can become even more daunting as the number of options increases. The alternative to maximizing is to be a satisficer. A satisficer has criteria and standards, but a satisficer is not worried about the possibility that there might be something better. Ultimately, Schwartz agrees with Simon's conclusion, that satisficing is, in fact, the maximizing strategy.

=== Why We Suffer ===
Schwartz integrates various psychological models for happiness showing how the problem of choice can be addressed by different strategies. What is important to note is that each of these strategies comes with its own bundle of psychological complication. “Freedom of choice” leads people to feel powerless and frustrated, because choosing ‘one’ among many other options means giving up the rest of the opportunities. At the same time, since people can easily change and replace the choice, the absolute value of making a choice no longer exists.

- Choice and happiness. Schwartz discusses the significance of common research methods that utilize a happiness scale. He sides with the opinion of psychologists David Myers and Robert Lane, who independently conclude that the current abundance of choice often leads to depression and feelings of loneliness. Schwartz draws particular attention to Lane's assertion that Americans are paying for increased affluence and freedom with a substantial decrease in the quality and quantity of community. What was once given by family, neighborhood and workplace now must be achieved and actively cultivated on an individual basis. The social fabric is no longer a birthright but has become a series of deliberated and demanding choices. Schwartz also discusses happiness with specific products. For example, he cites a study by Sheena Iyengar of Columbia University and Mark Lepper of Stanford University who found that when participants were faced with a smaller rather than larger array of jam, they were actually more satisfied with their tasting.
- Freedom or commitment. Schwartz connects this issue to economist Albert Hirschman's research into how populations respond to unhappiness: they can exit the situation, or they can protest and voice their concerns. While free-market governments give citizens the right to express their displeasure by exit, as in switching brands, Schwartz maintains that social relations are different. Instead, we usually give voice to displeasure, hoping to project influence on the situation.
- Second-order decisions. Law professor Cass Sunstein uses the term "second-order decisions" for decisions that follow a rule. Having the discipline to live "by the rules" eliminates countless troublesome choices in one's daily life. Schwartz shows that these second-order decisions can be divided into general categories of effectiveness for different situations: presumptions, standards, and cultural codes. Each of these methods are useful ways people use to parse the vast array of choices they confront.
- Missed opportunities. Schwartz finds that when people are faced with having to choose one option out of many desirable choices, they will begin to consider hypothetical trade-offs. Their options are evaluated in terms of missed opportunities instead of the opportunity's potential. In other words, after choosing an alternative with a plurality but not a majority of utility, people remember the sum of the lost utility rather than that they made the "utility-maximizing" choice. Schwartz maintains that one of the downsides of making trade-offs is it alters how we feel about the decisions we face; afterwards, it affects the level of satisfaction we experience from our decision. While psychologists have known for years about the harmful effects of negative emotion on decision making, Schwartz points to recent evidence showing how positive emotion has the opposite effect: in general, subjects are inclined to consider more possibilities when they are feeling happy.

== Validity research ==
Attempts to duplicate the paradox of choice in other studies have had mixed success. A meta-analysis incorporating research from 50 independent studies found no meaningful connection between choice and anxiety, but speculated that the variance in the studies left open the possibility that choice overload could be tied to certain highly specific and as yet poorly understood pre-conditions.

A new meta-analysis, conducted in 2015 and incorporating 99 studies, was able to isolate when reducing choices for your customers is most likely to boost sales. The study identified four key factors—choice set complexity, decision task difficulty, preference uncertainty, and decision goal—that moderate the impact of assortment size on choice overload. It also documented that when moderating variables are taken into account the overall effect of assortment size on choice overload is significant—a finding counter to the data reported by prior meta-analytic research.

Research presented in an article by Alexander Chernev demonstrates that, contrary to the common wisdom that more choice is always better, selections made from large assortments can lead to weaker preferences. Building on the extant literature, this research identifies ideal point availability as a key factor that determines when large assortments will strengthen consumer preferences and when large assortments will weaken preferences. It also states that the ideal point availability is also a key factor in consumer choices.

== See also ==
- Analysis paralysis
- Buridan's ass
- Collaborative filtering
- Choice theory
- Consumer psychology
- Consumerism
- Cultural evolution
- Decision theory
- Decision making
- Escape from Freedom
- Hick's law
- Mass marketing
- Sheena Iyengar
- Information overload
- Overchoice
- Paradox of plenty
- Shopping
- Social psychology
- Tyranny of small decisions
