= Harper Perennial =

Paperback imprint of HarperCollins Publishers

- Parent company: HarperCollins
- Founded: 1964
- Country of origin: United States
- Headquarters location: New York City, New York
- Publication types: Books
- Official website: harperperennial.com

Harper Perennial is a paperback imprint of the publishing house HarperCollins Publishers.

== Overview ==
Harper Perennial has divisions located in New York, London, Toronto, and Sydney. The imprint is descended from the Perennial Library imprint founded by Harper & Row in 1964. In 2005, Harper Perennial rebranded with a new logo (an Olive) and a distinct editorial direction emphasizing fiction and non-fiction from new and young authors. In the end matter, books often feature a brand-specific P.S. section that features extra material such as interviews.

Recent notable books include I Am Not Myself These Days by Josh Kilmer-Purcell, The Yacoubian Building by Alaa Al Aswany, This Will Be My Undoing by Morgan Jerkins, The Paradox of Choice by Barry Schwartz, Lullabies for Little Criminals by Heather O'Neil, Grab On to Me Tightly as If I Knew the Way by Bryan Charles, and The Yiddish Policemen's Union by Michael Chabon. In November 2011, they released The Shakespeare Guide to Italy: Retracing the Bard's Unknown Travels by Richard Paul Roe, a detailed examination of the locales mentioned in ten plays by Shakespeare.

Harper Perennial Modern Classics, a direct offshoot of the imprint, publishes authors such as Peter Singer, Harper Lee, Zora Neale Hurston, Aldous Huxley, Russell Banks, Thomas Pynchon, Milan Kundera, Gabriel García Márquez, Sylvia Plath, and Thornton Wilder.
