= Principle of good enough =

Principle of social research

Principle of good enough (often referred to as the "good enough" principle) is a heuristic and product philosophy in software engineering, systems design, and product management. It posits that a system or product that fulfills minimal core requirements, and is therefore "good enough" for the immediate needs of the user, is often preferable to delaying release in favor of a theoretically perfect or feature-complete alternative.

The principle advocates for pragmatism, speed, and resource efficiency. It relies on the assumption that users prefer early access to a functional solution over a delayed, perfect one. However, the concept is a subject of debate within the software industry. Critics, such as Pete McBreen, warn that the approach can serve as a justification for lower quality standards. This can potentially lead to technical debt and long-term maintenance issues.

In the context of the good enough principle, this theory provides the justification for halting development once core requirements are met. Continuing to search for a "perfect" solution (optimization) yields diminishing returns and incurs opportunity costs that outweigh the marginal benefits of further improvement.

== Origins and history ==
The rationale behind the principle of good enough, favoring solutions that deliver minimal sufficient functionality rather than full completeness, emerged gradually within engineering and design communities as a pragmatic heuristic.

=== Theoretical foundations ===
While explicitly named in the context of software engineering in the 1990s, the intellectual roots of the principle lie in the economic theory of bounded rationality. In 1956, Nobel laureate Herbert A. Simon introduced the concept of Satisficing, a portmanteau of "satisfy" and "suffice". Simon argued that human decision-makers do not possess the cognitive capacity to optimize every decision. Instead, they search through alternatives only until they find one that meets a certain acceptability threshold.

=== Emergence in agile software development ===
With the rise of lightweight, iterative development methodologies in the late 1990s and early 2000s, many software teams moved away from heavy upfront specifications toward incremental delivery, minimal documentation, and adaptive design. Research into the assumptions underlying agile methodologies identifies a shift in emphasis toward "working software" and iterative refinement rather than comprehensive upfront engineering.

Empirical data confirms that within agile teams, documentation often follows a "just enough" pattern. Rather than creating exhaustive artefacts, teams rely on minimal, sufficient documentation to support activity planning and effort estimation.

=== Extension beyond code ===
Outside of traditional software engineering, the ethos of minimal sufficient design has parallels in other disciplines. In knowledge representation and ontology engineering, for example, proponents have argued for lean, stakeholder-aware approaches rather than heavily formal, resource-intensive ones. The "Just Enough Ontology Engineering" methodology advocates for lightweight conceptual models that are easier to adopt and maintain.

=== Criticism and "Software Craftsmanship" ===
The shift toward "good enough" software was not universally accepted. In his 2002 book Software Craftsmanship: The New Imperative, Pete McBreen explicitly critiqued the methodology in a chapter titled "The Hazards of the Good Enough Software Approach". McBreen noted that while the principle was originally intended to manage scope, in practice it often reduced the professional standard of software delivery. He argued that it created a harmful distinction between "engineering" a robust solution and merely patching together something that works.

== Rationale and motivations ==
Proponents of the principle argue that in fast-moving markets, the cost of delay often exceeds the value of perfection.

By 2009, technology commentators noted that "good enough" had become a "new mantra" for the tech industry, observing that consumers were increasingly choosing accessible, lower-fidelity technologies (such as Flip cameras or MP3s) over higher-quality but more complex alternatives.

- Time-to-market: Releasing a product earlier allows for faster feedback cycles, which can be critical for Minimum Viable Product (MVP) strategies.
- Resource constraints: In environments with limited budget or computational power, such as Internet of Things devices, maximal completeness may be technically or financially impossible.
- Diminishing returns: According to the Pareto principle (80:20 rule), 80% of the value often comes from 20% of the features. Perfecting the remaining 20% may require disproportionate effort for little added value.

== Related concepts and comparison ==
The Principle of good enough is closely related to several established design philosophies. However, it is distinct from concepts that may appear similar on the surface.

=== Distinction from "Worse is Better" ===
The principle is frequently confused with the Worse is better philosophy popularized by Richard P. Gabriel. While both prioritize simplicity, they differ in focus.

- Good Enough Principle: Focuses on functional sufficiency. It asks, "Does this product have enough features to solve the user's problem right now?" It prioritizes the user's utility over feature completeness.
- Worse is Better: Focuses on implementation simplicity. It argues that it is better for the software architecture to be simple to implement, even if the interface is slightly less consistent or correct. In "Worse is Better," simplicity of the code takes precedence over functional perfection.

=== Other related concepts ===
- 80:20 rule
- Agile software development
- KISS principle
- Minimalism (computing)
- Minimum Viable Product
- Perfect is the enemy of good
- Satisficing
- You aren't gonna need it
