= Barry Schwartz (psychologist) =

American psychologist (born 1946)

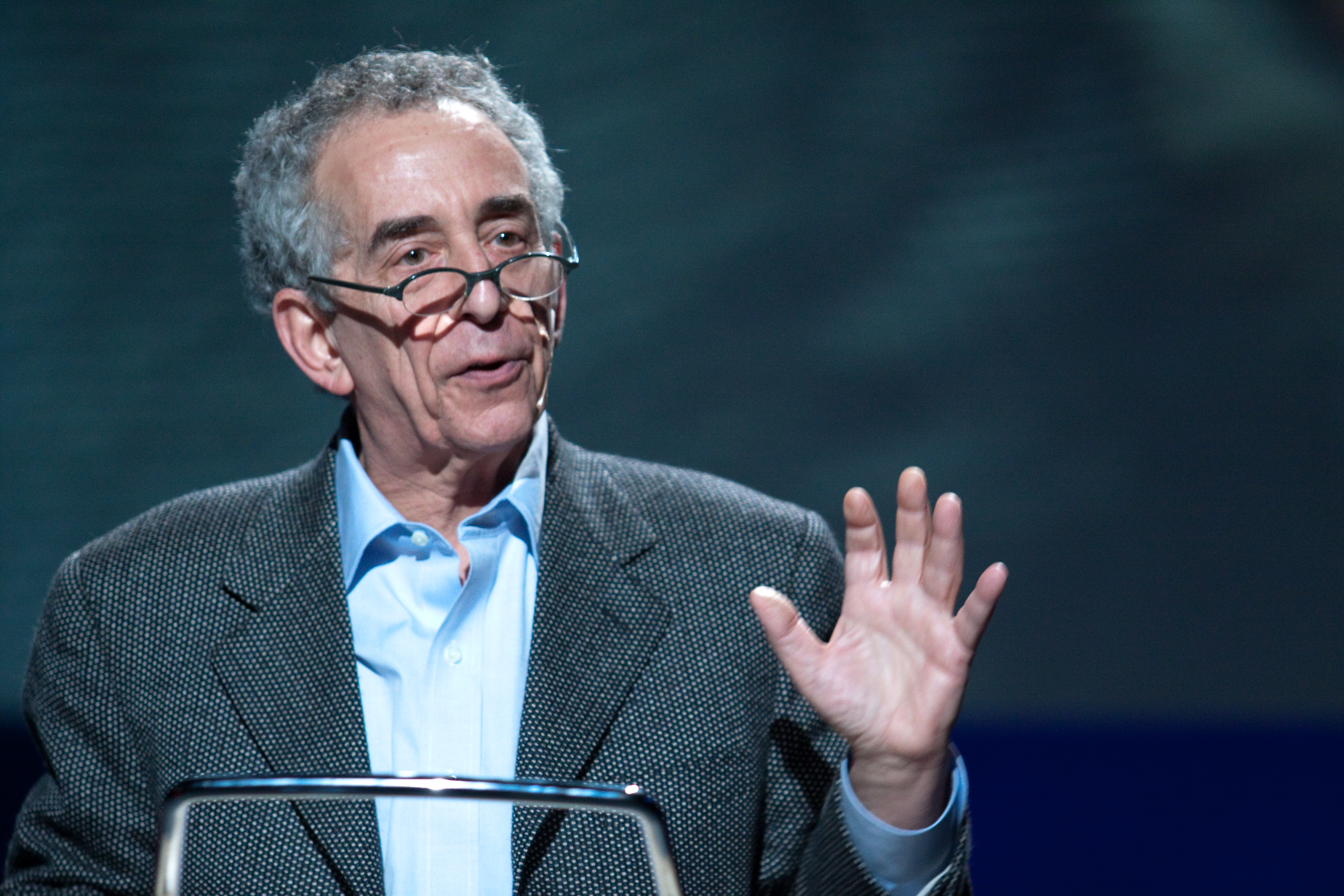
- Schwartz at TED in 2017
- Born: August 15, 1946 (age 79)

Academic background
- Education: New York University (B.A., 1968); University of Pennsylvania (Ph.D., 1971)
- Doctoral advisor: David R. Williams

Barry Schwartz (born August 15, 1946) is an American psychologist. Schwartz is the Dorwin Cartwright Emeritus Professor of Social Theory and Social Action at Swarthmore College and since 2016 has been visiting professor at the University of California, Berkeley. His work focuses on the intersection of psychology and economics. He frequently publishes editorials in The New York Times, applying his research in psychology to current events.

Schwartz's research addresses morality, decision-making and the inter-relationships between behavioral science and society. His books criticize certain philosophical roots of Western societies and expose underlying myths common in both lay and academic psychological theories. In particular, he is a critic of the "rational economic man" model in both psychology and economics. Schwartz studied under David Richmond Williams for his PhD at the University of Pennsylvania where he was a predoctoral fellow with the National Science Foundation.

== Publications ==
=== Articles ===
A select number of his works are available online.

=== Books ===
- Why We Work, Simon & Schuster/TED, 2015. (ISBN 9781476784861)
- The Paradox of Choice: Why More Is Less, Ecco, 2004. (ISBN 0-06-000568-8, ISBN 0-06-000569-6)
- Psychology of Learning and Behavior, with Edward Wasserman and Steven Robbins
- The Costs of Living: How Market Freedom Erodes the Best Things in Life, Xlibris Corporation, 2001. (ISBN 0-7388-5251-1)
- Learning and Memory, with Daniel Reisberg
- The Battle for Human Nature: Science, Morality and Modern Life
- Behaviorism, Science, and Human Nature, with Hugh Lacey, W. W. Norton & Company, 1983. (ISBN 0-393-01585-8)
- Practical Wisdom, with Kenneth Sharpe, Riverhead, 2010, (ISBN 978-1594487835)
