= Bronnie Ware =

Australian author

Bronnie Ware (born 19 February 1967) is an Australian author, songwriter and motivational speaker best known for her writings about the top deathbed regrets she heard during her time as a palliative carer described in her book The Top Five Regrets of the Dying.

In 2014 she published a second book, Your Year For Change: 52 Reflections For Regret-Free Living. After having her first child at 45, Ware wrote about her experiences in the book Bloom: A Tale of Courage, Surrender, and Breaking Through Upper Limits.

== Bibliography ==
- The Top Five Regrets of the Dying: A Life Transformed by the Dearly Departing (2011) (ISBN 1781800057)
- Your Year For Change: 52 Reflections For Regret-Free Living (2014) (ISBN 1401946933)
- Bloom: A Tale of Courage, Surrender, and Breaking Through Upper Limits (2017) (ISBN 1401951783)
