= The Top Five Regrets of the Dying =

2011 book by Bronnie Ware

The Top Five Regrets of the Dying - A Life Transformed by the Dearly Departing
- First edition (publ. Hay House)
- Author: Bronnie Ware
- Language: English
- Publication date: 2011

The Top Five Regrets of the Dying - A Life Transformed by the Dearly Departing is a 2011 book by Bronnie Ware inspired by her time in palliative care.

== Background ==
Ware first shared the insights in a 2009 blog post, "Regrets of the Dying". The blog post was widely shared worldwide and by 2012 had been read by eight million people.

In 2012 Ware expanded her blog post into a book, The Top Five Regrets of the Dying, which was translated into 27 languages.

== Top five regrets of the dying ==
According to Bronnie Ware, the five most common regrets shared by people nearing death were:

1. "I wish I'd had the courage to live a life true to myself, not the life others expected of me."
2. "I wish I hadn't worked so hard."
3. "I wish I'd had the courage to express my feelings."
4. "I wish I had stayed in touch with my friends."
5. "I wish that I had let myself be happier."

A 2018 study reached similar conclusions, finding that people were more likely to express "ideal-related regrets", such as failing to follow their dreams and live up to their full potential.
