= Perfectionism (psychology) =

Personality trait

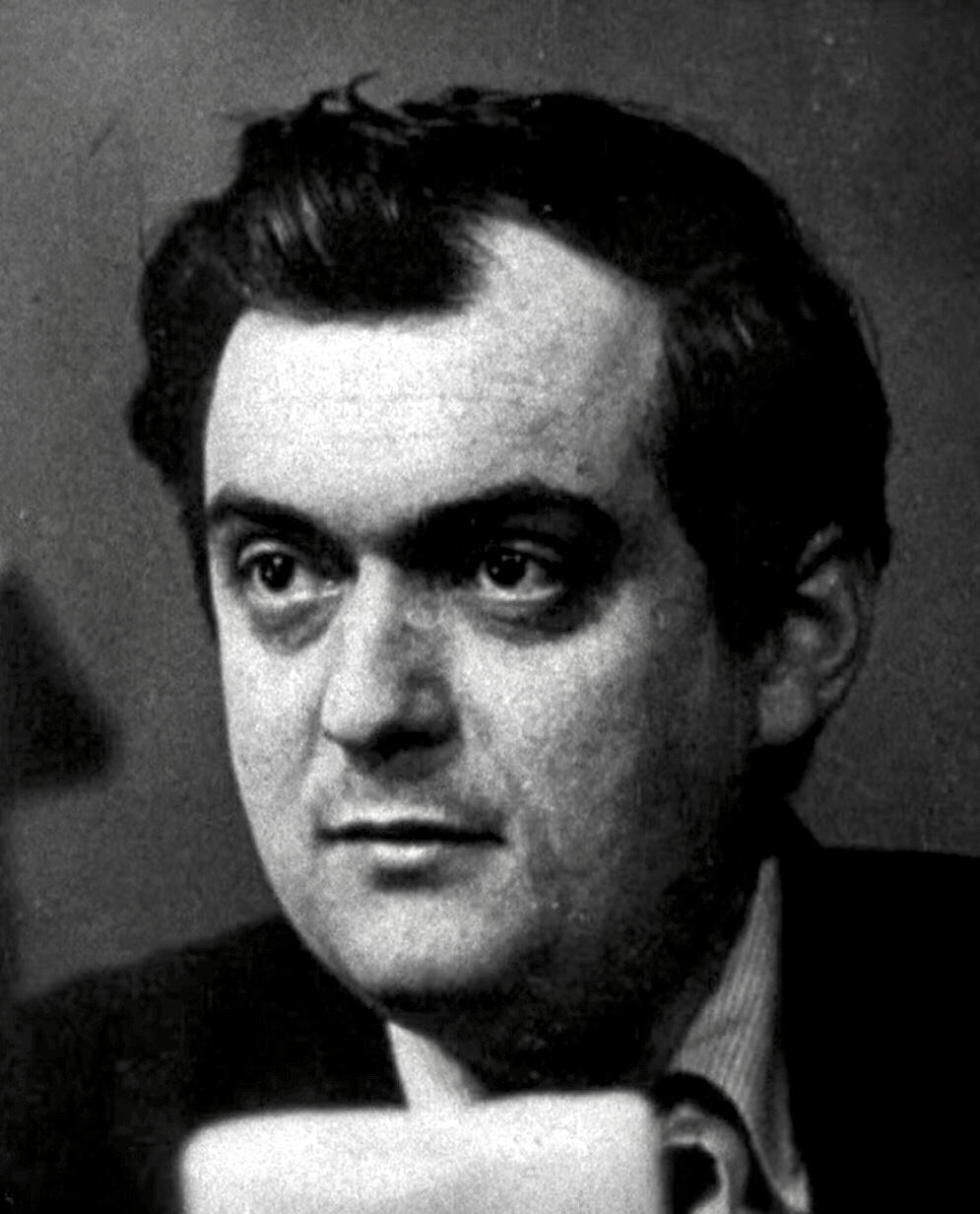
American filmmaker Stanley Kubrick was notorious for his professional perfectionism.

In psychology, perfectionism is a broad personality trait characterized by a person's concern with striving for flawlessness and perfection and is accompanied by critical self-evaluations and concerns regarding others' evaluations. It is best conceptualized as a multidimensional and multilayered personality characteristic, and initially some psychologists thought that there were many positive and negative aspects.

Maladaptive perfectionism drives people to be concerned with achieving unattainable ideals or unrealistic goals that often lead to many forms of adjustment problems such as depression, anxiety, OCD, OCPD and low self-esteem. In clinical settings, this kind of perfectionism is also known as anankastia, especially in obsessive–compulsive or personality disorder contexts. These adjustment problems often lead to suicidal thoughts and tendencies and influence or invite other psychological, physical, social, and further achievement problems in children, adolescents, and adults.

Perfectionist tendencies were found to be on the rise between 1989 and 2016 among 41,641 students at American, Canadian and British colleges who completed the Hewitt & Flett Multidimensional Perfectionism Scale.

== Definition ==
According to the American Psychological Association perfectionism is "the tendency to demand of others or of oneself an extremely high or even flawless level of performance, in excess of what is required by the situation. It is associated with depression, anxiety, eating disorders, and other mental health problems."

Perfectionists strain compulsively and unceasingly toward unattainable goals. They measure their self-worth by productivity and accomplishments to the point of distraction from other areas of life. Perfectionists pressure themselves to achieve unrealistic goals that lead to disappointment when not achieved. Perfectionists tend to be harsh critics of themselves, their work, and their failure to meet their own expectations.

=== Perfectionary paralysis ===
Perfectionary paralysis refers to a specific aspect of perfectionism in which an individual abandons their work due to an overwhelming pursuit of perfection. This occurs when the desire for flawlessness reaches such an extreme level that progress becomes impossible, leading to inaction or the complete dismissal of the task at hand. The term perfectionary paralysis is derived from two related psychological phenomena: creative paralysis and analysis paralysis. Both describe similar tendencies where overthinking or an excessive need for perfection hinders productivity and thus implicitly imply the idea of perfectionary paralysis.

=== Normal vs. neurotic ===
In 1978, D. E. Hamachek argued for two contrasting types of perfectionism, classifying people as tending towards normal perfectionism or neurotic perfectionism. Normal perfectionists are more inclined to pursue perfection without compromising their self-esteem, and derive pleasure from their efforts. Neurotic perfectionists are prone to strive for unrealistic goals and feel dissatisfied when they cannot reach them. Hamachek offers several strategies that have been proven useful in helping people change from maladaptive towards healthier behavior. Contemporary research supports the idea that these two basic aspects of perfectionist behavior, as well as other dimensions such as "nonperfectionism", can be differentiated. They have been labeled differently, and are sometimes referred to as positive striving and maladaptive evaluation concerns, active and passive perfectionism, positive and negative perfectionism, and adaptive and maladaptive perfectionism. Although there is a general perfectionism that affects all realms of life, some researchers contend that levels of perfectionism are significantly different across different domains (i.e. work, academic, sport, interpersonal relationships, home life).

However, it is debated whether perfectionism can be adaptive and has positive aspects. In fact, recent research suggests that what is termed "adaptive perfectionism" is associated with suicidal thinking, depression, eating disorders, poor health and early mortality. Some researchers argue that, certainly, a construct that causes people to think more about suicide, and places them at risk for depression, eating disorders, poor health, and early mortality is far from one that is adaptive. In fact, there is no empirical support for the assertion that a healthy form of perfectionism exists. Instead, what has been termed adaptive perfectionism has little relation to perfectionism and has more to do with striving for excellence. A relentless striving for unreasonably high expectations that are rarely achieved and an avoidance of imperfection at all costs is what distinguishes perfectionism from excellencism. Perfectionism therefore extends beyond adaptive strivings and is not a synonym for excellence or conscientiousness. Numerous researchers advise against using the term "adaptive perfectionism" as it is inappropriate for a personality trait.

There is some literature that supports the usage of adaptive perfectionism when used in comparison with maladaptive perfectionism. Differences were found when these two dimensions of perfectionism were paired with the Big Five personality traits. For example, adaptive perfectionism was found to predict openness, conscientiousness, and extraversion, while maladaptive perfectionism was found to predict neuroticism.

=== Strivings vs. concerns ===
Psychologists J. Stoeber and K. Otto suggested that perfectionism consists of two main dimensions: perfectionist strivings and perfectionist concerns. Perfectionist strivings are associated with positive aspects of perfectionism; perfectionist concerns are associated with negative aspects (see below).

- Healthy perfectionists score high in perfectionist strivings and low in perfectionist concerns.
- Unhealthy perfectionists score high in both strivings and concerns.
- Non-perfectionists show low levels of perfectionist strivings.

Prompted by earlier research providing empirical evidence that perfectionism could be associated with positive aspects (specifically perfectionist strivings), they challenged the widespread belief that perfectionism is only detrimental through a non-empirical narrative review. They claimed that people with high levels of perfectionist strivings and low levels of perfectionist concerns demonstrated more self-esteem, agreeableness, academic success and social interaction. This type of perfectionist also showed fewer psychological and somatic issues typically associated with perfectionism, namely depression, anxiety and maladaptive coping styles. However, empirical meta-analytic reviews have failed to replicate these claims.

=== The Comprehensive Model of Perfectionist Behaviour ===
The Comprehensive Model of Perfectionism (CMPB) operationalizes perfectionism as a multilevel and multidimensional personality style that contains a trait level, a self-presentational level, and a cognitive level.

The stable, dispositional, trait-like level of this model includes self-oriented perfectionism and socially prescribed perfectionism, as well as other-oriented perfectionism. Self-oriented perfectionism is characterized by requiring perfection from oneself, while socially prescribed perfectionism refers to the need to obtain acceptance by fulfilling actual or perceived expectations imposed by others. In contrast, other-oriented perfectionists direct their perfectionism towards external sources and are preoccupied with expecting perfection from others.

The second component of the Comprehensive Model of Perfectionism contains the interpersonal expression of perfection through impression management and self-monitoring. This relational component reflects the need to appear, rather than be, perfect via the promotion of perfection and the concealment of imperfection. Like the perfectionism traits, these components are also multifaceted. One of its facets, perfectionist self-promotion, refers to the expression of perfectionism by actively presenting a flawless, though often false, image of oneself. Another interpersonal facet, nondisplay of imperfection, is the expression of perfectionism through concealment of attributes or behaviours that may be deemed as imperfect, such as making mistakes in front of others. Similarly, nondisclosure of imperfection is also associated with concealment of self-aspects, but focuses on avoiding verbal disclosure of imperfections, such as not revealing personal information that may be judged negatively or admitting failures. All three facets are used as an (alleged) protection from feelings of low self-worth and possible rejection.

The self-relational/intrapersonal component of the CMPB refers to ruminative, perfectionist thinking and is characterized by cognitive processes concerning the need for perfection, as well as self-recriminations and a focus on the discrepancy between one's actual and ideal self. This component therefore entails the information processing related to perfectionism. These three components of the Comprehensive Model of Perfectionism are independent but interrelated, and can be present in individuals in heterogeneous, idiosyncratic patterns with different combinations.

=== The Perfectionism Social Disconnection Model ===
The Perfectionism Social Disconnection Model (PSDM) is a dynamic-relational model describing perfectionism and its consequences in an interpersonal context. This model asserts that perfectionism, via an interpersonal style characterized by aloofness and inauthenticity, leads to the social disconnection and rejection perfectionists aim to avoid. According to the PSDM, perfectionism develops in an early interpersonal context through asynchrony between child and caregiver, when there is a lack of attunement ("fit") between the temperament of the child and caregiver responses, leading to unfulfilled needs for belonging, acceptance, and self-esteem. This creates a relational schema of others as critical, and rejecting, and an internal model of oneself as defective which makes perfectionists highly sensitive to the potential for judgment and rejection in interpersonal encounters. Consequently, according to the PSDM, perfectionism serves an interpersonal purpose and the person relies on it as a means of fulfilling the needs for belonging and self-esteem. In an attempt to gain a sense of acceptance and connection while avoiding possible judgment and rejection, these individuals aim to be or appear flawless. Paradoxically, this often rigid, aloof, and self-concealing relational style increases the potential for alienation and rejection and can lead to social disconnection. In this way, the very behaviours that perfectionists consider as purportedly fulfilling unmet relational needs exert a detrimental influence on interpersonal encounters, so the alleged solution to social disconnection actually generates it. The PSDM also provides a link between perfectionism and its maladaptive consequences since the estrangement from oneself and others generated by perfectionism is associated with a number of adverse outcomes, such as interpersonal difficulties, depression, and suicide risk.

== Measurement ==
=== Multidimensional perfectionism scale (MPS) ===
Randy O. Frost et al. (1990) developed a multidimensional perfectionism scale (now known as the "Frost Multidimensional Perfectionism Scale", FMPS) with six dimensions:

1. Concern over making mistakes
2. High personal standards (striving for excellence)
3. The perception of high parental expectations
4. The perception of high parental criticism
5. The doubting of the quality of one's actions, and
6. A preference for order and organization.

Hewitt & Flett (1991) devised another "multidimensional perfectionism scale", a 45-item measure that rates three aspects of perfectionist self-presentation:

1. Self-oriented perfectionism
2. Other-oriented perfectionism, and
3. Socially prescribed perfectionism.

Self-oriented perfectionism refers to having unrealistic expectations and standards for oneself that lead to perfectionist motivation. Other-oriented perfectionism is having unrealistic expectations and standards for others that in turn pressure them to have perfectionist motivations of their own. Socially prescribed perfectionism is characterized by developing perfectionist motivations due actual or perceived high expectations of significant others. Parents who push their children to be successful in certain endeavors (such as athletics or academics) provide an example of what often causes this type of perfectionism, as the children feel that they must meet their parents' lofty expectations.

A similarity has been pointed out among Frost's distinction between setting high standards for oneself and the level of concern over making mistakes in performance (the two most important dimensions of the FMPS) and Hewitt & Flett's distinction between self-oriented versus socially prescribed perfectionism.

=== Perfectionist Self-Presentation Scale (PSPS) ===
Hewitt et al. (2003) developed the perfectionist Self-Presentation Scale (PSPS), a 27-item self-report measure assessing the three interpersonal, expressive components of the Comprehensive Model of Perfectionism. It includes three subscales pertaining to perfectionist self-presentation, i.e., to the need to appear flawless:

1. Perfectionist self-promotion
2. Non-display of imperfection
3. Nondisclosure of imperfection

The PSPS measures the expression (the process) of the trait of perfectionism and is directly linked to the perfectionism traits, particularly self-oriented and socially prescribed perfectionism. Additionally, the dimensions of the PSPS correlate with measures of psychological distress, such as anxiety symptoms, indicating that perfectionist self-presentation is a maladaptive, defensive tendency.

=== Perfectionism Cognitions Inventory (PCI) ===
The Perfectionism Cognitions Inventory (PCI) developed by Flett, Hewitt, Blankstein, and Gray (1998) is a 25-item inventory measuring the self-relational, cognitive component of perfectionism in the form of automatic thoughts about attaining perfection. It includes statements about perfectionism-themed cognitions, such as references to social comparison and awareness of being imperfect and failing to attain high expectations. Rather than emphasizing trait-like statements, the PCI is characterized by state-like statements, focusing on the varying situational and temporal contexts that can lead to different perfectionist thoughts.

The PCI is associated with the presence of negative automatic thoughts and scoring high on this measure has been linked to a high degree of self-criticism, self-blame and failure perseveration.

=== Almost perfect scale-revised (APS-R) ===
Slaney and his colleagues (1996) developed the Almost Perfect Scale-Revised (APS-R). People are classified based on their scores for three measures:

1. High Standards
2. Order, and
3. Discrepancy

Discrepancy refers to the belief that personal high standards are not being met, which is the defining negative aspect of perfectionism. Those with high scores in what the APS-R considers maladaptive perfectionism typically yield the highest social stress and anxiety scores, reflecting their feelings of inadequacy and low self-esteem. However, whether high standards as measured by APS-R actually assess perfectionism is debatable.

In general, the APS-R is a relatively easy instrument to administer, and can be used to identify perfectionist adolescents as well as adults, though it has yet to be proven useful for children. Two other forms of the APS-R measure perfectionism directed towards intimate partners (Dyadic Almost Perfect Scale) and perceived perfectionism from one's family (Family Almost Perfect Scale).

The validity of the APS-R has been challenged. Namely, some researchers maintain that high standards are not necessarily perfectionist standards. For instance, it has been shown that when the APS-R is re-worded to reflect more perfectionist terms, outcomes differ in comparison to the original wording of this scale. Specifically, only the reworded, more perfectionist scale is associated with maladjustment, such as depression and anxiety, while only the original scale is related to adaptive outcomes. This suggests that what is labelled as "adaptive perfectionism" in the original APS-R may simply reflect high standards. Moreover, a number of researchers view the relevance of discrepancy to the perfectionism literature as suspect given the number of negative mood terms included. Including negative mood terms in items, such as the discrepancy subscale, greatly increases the likelihood for discovering a relation between perfectionism and neuroticism which may be simply due to wording rather than a perfectionism-neuroticism link.

=== Physical appearance perfectionism scale (PAPS) ===
The Physical Appearance Perfectionism Scale (PAPS) explains a particular type of perfectionism: the desire for a perfect physical appearance. The PAPS is a multidimensional assessment of physical appearance perfectionism that provides the most insight when the sub-scales are evaluated separately.

In general, the PAPS allows researchers to determine participants' body image and self-conceptions of their looks, which is critical in present times when so much attention is paid to attractiveness and obtaining the ideal appearance. The two sub-scales it uses to assess appearance concerns are:

1. Worry About Imperfection, and
2. Hope For Perfection.

Those that obtain high "Worry About Imperfection" scores are usually greatly concerned with attaining perfection, physical appearance, and body control behavior. They also demonstrate low positive self-perceptions of their appearance, whereas those scoring highly on "Hope for Perfection" yielded high positive self-perceptions. Hope For Perfection also corresponded with impression management behaviors and striving for ambitious goals.

In summary, Worry About Imperfection relates to negative aspects of appearance perfectionism, while Hope For Perfection relates to positive aspects. One limitation of using the PAPS is the lack of psychological literature evaluating its validity.

== Psychological implications ==
Perfectionists tend to dissociate themselves from their flaws or what they believe are flaws (such as negative emotions) and can become hypocritical and hypercritical of others, seeking the illusion of virtue to hide their own vices.

Researchers have begun to investigate the role of perfectionism in various mental disorders such as depression, anxiety, eating disorders, autism and personality disorders, as well as suicide. Each disorder is associated with varying levels of the three subscales on the Multidimensional Perfectionism Scale. For instance, socially prescribed perfectionism in young women has been associated with greater body-image dissatisfaction and avoidance of social situations that focus on weight and physical appearance.

The relationship that exists between perfectionist tendencies and methods of coping with stress has also been examined in some detail. Those who displayed tendencies associated with perfectionism, such as rumination over past events or fixation on mistakes, tended to utilize more passive or avoidance coping. They also tended to utilize self-criticism as a coping method. This is consistent with theories that conceptualize self-criticism as a central element of perfectionism.

== Consequences ==
Perfectionism can be damaging. It can take the form of procrastination when used to postpone tasks and self-deprecation when used to excuse poor performance or to seek sympathy and affirmation from other people. These, together or separate, are self-handicapping strategies perfectionists may use to protect their sense of self-competence. In general, perfectionists feel constant pressure to meet their high expectations, which creates cognitive dissonance when expectations cannot be met. Perfectionism has been associated with numerous other psychological and physiological complications. Moreover, perfectionism may result in alienation and social disconnection via certain rigid interpersonal patterns common to perfectionist individuals.

=== Suicide ===
Perfectionism is increasingly considered to be a risk factor for suicide. The tendency of perfectionists to have excessively high expectations of self and to be self-critical when their efforts do not meet the expectations they have established, combined with their tendency to present a public image of flawlessness increases their risk of suicidal ideation while decreasing the likelihood of seeking help when it is needed. Perfectionism is one of many suicide predictors that affect individuals negatively via pressure to fulfill other- or self-generated high expectations, feeling incapable of living up to them, and social disconnection.

Importantly, the relation between suicidality and perfectionism depends on the particular perfectionism dimensions. Perfectionist strivings are associated with suicidal ideation while perfectionist concerns are predictive of both suicidal ideation and attempting suicide. Additionally, socially prescribed perfectionism, a type of perfectionist concern, was found to be associated with both baseline and long-term suicidal ideation. This implies that perfectionist concerns, such as socially prescribed perfectionism, are related to more pernicious outcomes in the context of suicide.

=== Anorexia nervosa ===
Perfectionism has been linked with anorexia nervosa in research for decades. Researchers in 1949 described the behavior of the average anorexic person as being "rigid" and "hyperconscious", observing also a tendency to "neatness, meticulosity, and a mulish stubbornness not amenable to reason [which] make her a rank perfectionist". Perfectionism is an enduring characteristic in the biographies of anorexics. It is present before the onset of the eating disorder, generally in childhood, during the illness, and also, after remission. The incessant striving for thinness among anorexics is itself a manifestation of this personality style, of an insistence upon meeting unattainably high standards of performance.

Because of its chronicity, those with eating disorders also display perfectionist tendencies in other domains of life than dieting and weight control. Over-achievement at school, for example, has been observed among anorexics, as a result of their overly industrious behavior.

The level of perfectionism was found to have an influence on individual's long-term recovery of anorexia. Those who scored a lower range of perfectionism were able to have a faster recovery rate than patients who scored high in perfectionism.

=== General applications ===
Perfectionism often shows up in performance at work or school, neatness and aesthetics, organization, writing, speaking, physical appearance, and health and personal cleanliness. In the workplace, perfectionism is often marked by low productivity and missed deadlines as people lose time and energy by paying attention to irrelevant details of their tasks, ranging from major projects to mundane daily activities. This can lead to depression, social alienation, and a greater risk of workplace "accidents". Adderholdt-Elliot (1989) describes five characteristics of perfectionist students and teachers which contribute to underachievement: procrastination, fear of failure, an "all-or-nothing" mindset, paralyzed perfectionism, and workaholism.

According to C. Allen, in intimate relationships, unrealistic expectations can cause significant dissatisfaction for both partners. Greenspon lists behaviors, thoughts, and feelings that typically characterize perfectionism. Perfectionists will not be content with their work until it meets their standards, which can make perfectionists less efficient in finishing projects, and they therefore will struggle to meet deadlines.

In a different occupational context, athletes may develop perfectionist tendencies. Optimal physical and mental performance is critical for professional athletes, which are aspects that closely relate to perfectionism. Although perfectionist athletes strive to succeed, they can be limited by their intense fear of failure and therefore not exert themselves fully or feel overly personally responsible for a loss. Because their success is frequently measured by a score or statistics, perfectionist athletes may feel excessive pressure to succeed.

=== Medical complications ===
Perfectionism is a risk factor for obsessive–compulsive disorder, obsessive–compulsive personality disorder, eating disorders, social anxiety, body dysmorphic disorder, workaholism, self harm and suicide, substance abuse, and clinical depression as well as physical problems like heart disease. In addition, studies have found that people with perfectionism have a higher mortality rate than those without perfectionism. A possible reason for this is the additional stress and worry that accompanies the irrational belief that everything should be perfect.

Therapists who attempt to tackle the negative thinking that surrounds perfectionism, in particular the "all-or-nothing" thinking in which the client believes that an achievement is either perfect or useless. They encourage clients to set realistic goals and to face their fear of failure.

Since perfectionism is a self-esteem issue based on emotional convictions about what one must do to be acceptable as a person, negative thinking is most successfully addressed in the context of a recovery process which directly addresses these convictions.

=== Impact on psychological treatment ===
A number of studies suggest that perfectionism can limit the effectiveness of psychotherapy. Namely, perfectionism impedes treatment success across seeking, maintaining, and ultimately benefiting from help. Unfavourable attitudes and negative beliefs towards seeking help present a barrier to treatment among perfectionists. When they do attend treatment, perfectionists, especially those high in perfectionist self-presentation, are more likely to experience initial clinical interviews as anxiety-provoking and appraise their performance as inadequate. Perfectionism can also affect treatment adherence. For example, a study demonstrated that other-oriented perfectionism is associated with treatment attrition. Further, treatment effectiveness may be compromised by perfectionists' tendency to present an image of flawlessness and avoid self-disclosures because of an excessive sensitivity to judgment and rejection. Most importantly, treatment success may be negatively impacted due to the interpersonal disconnection prevalent among perfectionists which is associated with a failure to develop or strengthen a positive therapeutic alliance.

== Narcissism ==
According to Arnold Cooper, narcissism can be considered as a self-perceived form of perfectionism – "an insistence on perfection in the idealized self-object and the limitless power of the grandiose self. These are rooted in traumatic injuries to the grandiose self." In support, research suggests some forms of perfectionism are associated with grandiose narcissism while others are associated with vulnerable narcissism. Similar to perfectionism, narcissism, particularly in its vulnerable form, is associated with a contingent self-worth and a need for validation. Narcissists often are pseudo-perfectionists and require being the center of attention and create situations where they will receive attention. This attempt at being perfect is cohesive with the narcissist's grandiose self-image. Behind such perfectionism, self psychology would see earlier traumatic injuries to the grandiose self.

Vulnerable narcissism is mostly covert and is characterized by a need for other people's recognition (e.g., validation or admiration) and a sense of self-worth that is contingent upon this recognition. If a perceived state of perfection is not attained and recognition is not forthcoming or doubtful, this can result in a lowered self-worth, social withdrawal and avoidance behaviours as the individual fear that he or she will lose validation and admiration.

== Personality traits ==
Perfectionism is one of Raymond Cattell's 16 Personality Factors. According to this construct, people who are organized, compulsive, self-disciplined, socially precise, exacting will power, controlled, and self-sentimental are perfectionists. In the Big Five personality traits, perfectionism is an extreme manifestation of conscientiousness and can provoke increasing neuroticism as the perfectionist's expectations are not met.

Perfectionist concerns are more similar to neuroticism while perfectionist strivings are more similar to conscientiousness.

== Children and adolescents ==
The prevalence of perfectionism is high in children and adolescents, with estimates ranging from 25% to 30%. Similar to adults, perfectionism in young people is a core vulnerability factor for a variety of negative outcomes, such as depression, anxiety, suicidal ideation, and obsessive-compulsive disorder. In order to measure the two trait components of self-oriented and socially prescribed perfectionism in this age group, the widely used Child-Adolescent Perfectionism Scale (CAPS) can be useful.

== Treatments ==
=== Cognitive-behavioral therapy (CBT) ===
Cognitive-behavioral therapy (CBT) has been shown to successfully help perfectionists in reducing social anxiety, public self-consciousness, obsessive-compulsive disorder (OCD) behaviors, and perfectionism. By using this approach, a person can begin to recognize their irrational thinking and find an alternative way to approach situations.

=== Psychodynamic/interpersonal therapy (PI) ===
Consistent with the development and expression of perfectionism within an interpersonal context, this treatment focuses on the dynamic-relational basis of perfectionism. Rather than targeting perfectionist behaviour directly and aiming merely for symptom reduction, dynamic-relational therapy is characterized by a focus on the maladaptive relational patterns and interpersonal dynamics underlying and maintaining perfectionism. According to research by Hewitt et al. (2015), this form of treatment is associated with long-lasting reductions in both perfectionism and associated distress.

=== Exposure and response prevention (ERP) ===
Exposure and response prevention (ERP) is also employed by psychologists in the treatment of obsessive-compulsive symptoms, including perfectionism. This form of therapy is premised on encouraging individuals to stop their perfectionist behavior in tasks that they would normally pursue toward perfection. Over time, anxiety may decrease as the person finds that there are no major consequences of completing particular tasks imperfectly.

=== Acceptance-based behavior therapy (ABBT) ===
Acceptance-based behavior therapy (ABBT) was demonstrated to have a major contribution to treat perfectionism from increasing awareness, increasing acceptance, and living a meaningful life. These practices were shown to help reduce anxiety, depression, and social phobia. This approach has been shown to be effective six months post to the therapy.

== See also ==
- Cognitive-behavioral therapy
- Psychodynamic psychotherapy
- Obsessive-compulsive personality disorder
- Overachiever
- Pedant
- Perfect is the enemy of good
- Perfection
- Satisficing
- Self-acceptance
- Self-compassion
