= Overchoice =

Degradation of decision making with too many choices

[Overchoice takes place when] the advantages of diversity and individualization are canceled by the complexity of buyer's decision-making process.

— From Alvin Toffler, Future Shock, 1971

Overchoice or choice overload is the paradoxical phenomenon in which choosing between a large variety of options can be detrimental to decision making processes. The term was first introduced by Alvin Toffler in his 1970 book, Future Shock.

== Psychological process ==
The phenomenon of overchoice occurs when many equivalent choices are available. Making a decision becomes overwhelming due to the many potential outcomes and risks that may result from making the wrong choice. Having too many approximately equally good options is mentally draining because each option must be weighed against alternatives to select the best one. The satisfaction of choices by number of options available can be described by an inverted U model. In this model, having no choice results in very low satisfaction. Initially more choices lead to more satisfaction, but as the number of choices increases it then peaks and people tend to feel more pressure, confusion, and potentially dissatisfaction with their choice. Although larger choice sets can be initially appealing, smaller choice sets lead to increased satisfaction and reduced regret. Another component of overchoice is the perception of time. Extensive choice sets can seem even more difficult with a limited time constraint.

== Preconditions ==
Choice overload is not a problem in all cases, there are some preconditions that must be met before the effect can take place. First, people making the choice must not have a clear prior preference for an item type or category. When the choice-maker has a preference, the number of options has little impact on the final decision and satisfaction. Second, there must not be a clearly dominant option in the choice set, meaning that all options must be perceived of equivalent quality. One option cannot stand out as being better from the rest. The presence of a superior option and many less desirable options will result in a more satisfied decision. Third, there is a negative correlation between choice assortment (quantity) and satisfaction only in people less familiar with the choice set. This means that if the person making a choice has expertise in the subject matter, they can more easily sort through the options and not be overwhelmed by the variety.

== Psychological implications ==
Decision-makers in large choice situations enjoy the decision process more than those with smaller choice sets, but feel more responsible for their decisions. Despite this, more choices result with more dissatisfaction and regret in decisions. The feeling of responsibility causes cognitive dissonance when presented with large array situations. In this situation, cognitive dissonance results when there is a mental difference between the choice made and the choice that should have been made. More choices lead to more cognitive dissonance because it increases the chance that the decision-maker made the wrong decision. These large array situations cause the chooser to feel both enjoyment as well as feel overwhelmed with their choices. These opposing emotions contribute to cognitive dissonance, and causes the chooser to feel less motivated to make a decision. This also disables them from using psychological processes to enhance the attractiveness of their own choices. The amount of time allotted to make a decision also has an effect on an individual's perception of their choice. Larger choice sets with a small amount of time results in more regret with the decision. When more time is provided, the process of choosing is more enjoyable in large array situations and results in less regret after the decision has been made.

== Reversal when choosing for others ==
Choice overload is reversed when people choose for another person. Polman has found that overload is context dependent: choosing from many alternatives by itself is not demotivating. Polman found that it is not always a case of whether choices differ for the self and others at risk, but rather "according to a selective focus on positive and negative information". Evidence shows there is a different regulatory focus for others compared to the self in decision-making. Therefore, there may be substantial implications for a variety of psychological processes in relation to self-other decision-making.

Among personal decision-makers, a prevention focus is activated and people are more satisfied with their choices after choosing among few options compared to many options, i.e. choice overload. However, individuals experience a reverse choice overload effect when acting as proxy decision-makers.

== In an economic setting ==
The psychological phenomenon of overchoice can most often be seen in economic applications. There are limitless products currently on the market. Having more choices, such as a vast amount of goods and services available, appears to be appealing initially, but too many choices can make decisions more difficult. According to Miller (1956), a consumer can only process seven items at a time. After that the consumer would have to create a coping strategy to make an informed decision. This can lead to consumers being indecisive, unhappy, and even refrain from making the choice (purchase) at all. Alvin Toffler noted that as the choice turns to overchoice, "freedom of more choices" becomes the opposite—the "unfreedom". Often, a customer makes a decision without sufficiently researching his choices, which may often require days. When confronted with too many choices especially under a time constraint, many people prefer to make no choice at all, even if making a choice would lead to a better outcome.

The existence of over choice, both perceived and real, is supported by studies as early as the mid-1970s. Numbers of various brands, from soaps to cars, have been steadily rising for over half a century. In just one example—different brands of soap and detergents—the numbers of choices offered by an average US supermarket went from 65 in 1950, through 200 in 1963, to over 360 in 2004. The more choices tend to increase the time it requires to make a decision.

=== Variety and complexity ===
There are two steps involved in making a choice to purchase. First, the consumer selects an assortment. Second, the consumer chooses an option within the assortment. Variety and complexity vary in their importance in carrying out these steps successfully, resulting in the consumer deciding to make a purchase.

Variety is the positive aspect of assortment. When selecting an assortment during the perception stage, the first stage of deciding, consumers want more variety.

Complexity is the negative aspect of assortment. Complexity is important for the second step in making a choice—when a consumer needs to choose an option from an assortment. When making a choice for an individual item within an assortment, too much variety increases complexity. This can cause a consumer to delay or opt out of making a decision.

Images are processed as a whole when making a purchasing decision. This means they require less mental effort to be processed which gives the consumer a sense that the information is being processed faster. Consumers prefer this visual shortcut to processing, termed "visual heuristic" by Townsend, no matter how big the choice set size. Images increase our perceived variety of options. As previously stated, variety is good when making the first step of choosing an assortment. On the other hand, verbal descriptions are processed in a way that the words that make up a sentence are perceived individually. That is, our minds string words along to develop our understanding. In larger choice sets where there is more variety, perceived complexity decreases when verbal descriptions are used.

== See also ==
- Analysis paralysis
- Buyer's remorse
- Choice architecture
- Information overload
- Market cannibalism
- Satisficing
- The Paradox of Choice: Why More Is Less, a 2004 book by Barry Schwartz
- Tyranny of small decisions
