= Daniel Reisberg =

American academic

Daniel Reisberg is an American academic who is the Patricia and Clifford Lunneborg Professor of Psychology at Reed College in Portland, Oregon. His specialty is cognitive psychology, and he focuses on memory, judgment, and imagery, particularly in relation to emotion.

Reisberg earned his B.A. in psychology and philosophy from Swarthmore College in 1975. He then attended the University of Pennsylvania, obtaining an M.A. in 1976 and a Ph.D. in 1980. Reisberg has been teaching at Reed College since 1986.

Reisberg is the author of The Science of Perception and Memory: A Pragmatic Guide for the Justice System (Oxford University Press). Reisberg also consults widely with the justice community, and occasionally appears in court as an expert witness.
