= Satisficing =

Cognitive heuristic of searching for an acceptable decision

Satisficing is a decision-making strategy or cognitive heuristic that entails searching through the available alternatives until an acceptability threshold is met, without necessarily maximizing any specific objective. The term satisficing, a portmanteau of satisfy and suffice, was introduced by Herbert A. Simon in 1956, although the concept was first posited in his 1947 book Administrative Behavior. Simon used satisficing to explain the behavior of decision makers under circumstances in which an optimal solution cannot be determined. He maintained that many natural problems are characterized by computational intractability or a lack of information, both of which preclude the use of mathematical optimization procedures. He observed in his Nobel Prize in Economics speech that "decision makers can satisfice either by finding optimum solutions for a simplified world, or by finding satisfactory solutions for a more realistic world. Neither approach, in general, dominates the other, and both have continued to co-exist in the world of management science".

Simon formulated the concept within a novel approach to rationality, which posits that rational choice theory is an unrealistic description of human decision processes and calls for psychological realism. He referred to this approach as bounded rationality. Moral satisficing is a branch of bounded rationality that views moral behavior as based on pragmatic social heuristics rather than on moral rules or optimization principles. These heuristics are neither good nor bad per se, but only in relation to the environments in which they are used. Some consequentialist theories in moral philosophy use the concept of satisficing in a similar sense, though most call for optimization instead.

== In decision-making research ==
Two traditions of satisficing exist in decision-making research: Simon's program of studying how individuals or institutions rely on heuristic solutions in the real world, and the program of finding optimal solutions to problems simplified by convenient mathematical assumptions (so that optimization is possible).

=== Heuristic Satisficing ===
Heuristic satisficing refers to the use of aspiration levels when choosing from different paths of action. By this account, decision-makers select the first option that meets a given need or select the option that seems to address most needs rather than the "optimal" solution. The basic model of aspiration-level adaptation is as follows:

Step 1: Set an aspiration level α.

Step 2: Choose the first option that meets or exceeds α.

Step 3: If no option has satisfied α after time β, then change α by an amount γ and continue until a satisfying option is found.

Example: Consider pricing commodities. An analysis of 628 used car dealers showed that 97% relied on a form of satisficing. Most set the initial price α in the middle of the price range of comparable cars and lowered the price if the car was not sold after 24 days (β) by about 3% (γ). A minority (19%), mostly smaller dealerships, set a low initial price and kept it unchanged (no Step 3). The car dealers adapted the parameters to their business environment. For instance, they decreased the waiting time β by about 3% for each additional competitor in the area.

Note that aspiration-level adaptation is a process model of actual behavior rather than an as-if optimization model, and accordingly requires an analysis of how people actually make decisions. It allows for predicting surprising effects such as the "cheap twin paradox", where two similar cars have substantially different price tags in the same dealership.[4] The reason is that one car entered the dealership earlier and had at least one change in price at the time the second car arrived.

Example: A task is to sew a patch onto a pair of blue pants. The best needle to do the threading is a 4-cm-long needle with a 3-millimeter eye. This needle is hidden in a haystack along with 1,000 other needles varying in size from 1 cm to 6 cm. Satisficing claims that the first needle that can sew on the patch is the one that should be used. Spending time searching for that one specific needle in the haystack is a waste of energy and resources.

A crucial determinant of a satisficing decision strategy concerns the construction of the aspiration level. In many circumstances, the individual may be uncertain about the aspiration level.

Example: An individual who only seeks a satisfactory retirement income may not know what level of wealth is required—given uncertainty about future prices—to ensure a satisfactory income. In this case, the individual can only evaluate outcomes on the basis of their probability of being satisfactory. If the individual chooses that outcome which has the maximum chance of being satisfactory, then this individual's behavior is theoretically indistinguishable from that of an optimizing individual under certain conditions.

Another key issue concerns an evaluation of satisficing strategies. Although often regarded as an inferior decision strategy, specific satisficing strategies for inference have been shown to be ecologically rational, that is in particular decision environments, they can outperform alternative decision strategies.

Satisficing also occurs in consensus building when the group looks towards a solution everyone can agree on even if it may not be the best.

Example: A group spends hours projecting the next fiscal year's budget. After hours of debating they eventually reach a consensus, only to have one person speak up and ask if the projections are correct. When the group becomes upset at the question, it is not because this person is wrong to ask, but rather because the group has already come up with a solution that works. The projection may not be what will actually come, but the majority agrees on one number and thus the projection is good enough to close the book on the budget.

=== Optimization ===
One popular method for rationalizing satisficing is optimization when all costs, including the cost of the optimization calculations themselves and the cost of getting information for use in those calculations, are considered. As a result, the eventual choice is usually sub-optimal in regard to the main goal of the optimization, i.e., different from the optimum in the case that the costs of choosing are not taken into account.

==== As a form of optimization ====
Alternatively, satisficing can be considered to be just constraint satisfaction, the process of finding a solution satisfying a set of constraints, without concern for finding an optimum. Any such satisficing problem can be formulated as an (equivalent) optimization problem using the indicator function of the satisficing requirements as an objective function. More formally, if X denotes the set of all options and S ⊆ X denotes the set of "satisficing" options, then selecting a satisficing solution (an element of S) is equivalent to the following optimization problem

$$\max_{s\in X} I_{S}(s)$$

where I_{s} denotes the Indicator function of S, that is

$$I_{S}(s):=\begin{cases} \begin{array}{ccc} 1 &,& s\in S\\
0 &,& s\notin S
\end{array}
\end{cases} \ , \ s\in X$$

A solution s ∈ X to this optimization problem is optimal if, and only if, it is a satisficing option (an element of S). Thus, from a decision theory point of view, the distinction between "optimizing" and "satisficing" is essentially a stylistic issue (that can nevertheless be very important in certain applications) rather than a substantive issue. What is important to determine is what should be optimized and what should be satisficed. The following quote from Jan Odhnoff's 1965 paper is appropriate:

In my opinion there is room for both 'optimizing' and 'satisficing' models in business economics. Unfortunately, the difference between 'optimizing' and 'satisficing' is often referred to as a difference in the quality of a certain choice. It is a triviality that an optimal result in an optimization can be an unsatisfactory result in a satisficing model. The best things would therefore be to avoid a general use of these two words.

==== Applied to the utility framework ====
In economics, satisficing is a behavior which attempts to achieve at least some minimum level of a particular variable, but which does not necessarily maximize its value. The most common application of the concept in economics is in the behavioral theory of the firm, which, unlike traditional accounts, postulates that producers treat profit not as a goal to be maximized, but as a constraint. Under these theories, a critical level of profit must be achieved by firms; thereafter, priority is attached to the attainment of other goals.

More formally, as before if X denotes the set of all options s, and we have the payoff function U(s) which gives the payoff enjoyed by the agent for each option. Suppose we define the optimum payoff U^{*} the solution to

$$\max_{s\in X} U(s)$$

with the optimum actions being the set O of options such that U(s^{*}) = U^{*} (i.e. it is the set of all options that yield the maximum payoff). Assume that the set O has at least one element.

The idea of the aspiration level was introduced by Herbert A. Simon and developed in economics by Richard Cyert and James March in their 1963 book A Behavioral Theory of the Firm. The aspiration level is the payoff that the agent aspires to: if the agent achieves at least this level it is satisfied, and if it does not achieve it, the agent is not satisfied. Let us define the aspiration level A and assume that A ≤ U^{*}. Clearly, whilst it is possible that someone can aspire to something that is better than the optimum, it is in a sense irrational to do so. So, we require the aspiration level to be at or below the optimum payoff.

We can then define the set of satisficing options S as all those options that yield at least A: s ∈ S if and only if A ≤ U(s). Clearly since A ≤ U^{*}, it follows that O ⊆ S. That is, the set of optimum actions is a subset of the set of satisficing options. So, when an agent satisfices, then she will choose from a larger set of actions than the agent who optimizes. One way of looking at this is that the satisficing agent is not putting in the effort to get to the precise optimum or is unable to exclude actions that are below the optimum but still above aspiration.

An equivalent way of looking at satisficing is epsilon-optimization (that means you choose your actions so that the payoff is within epsilon of the optimum). If we define the "gap" between the optimum and the aspiration as ε where ε = U^{*} − A. Then the set of satisficing options S(ε) can be defined as all those options s such that U(s) ≥ U^{*} − ε.

==== Other applications in economics ====
Apart from the behavioral theory of the firm, applications of the idea of satisficing behavior in economics include the Akerlof and Yellen model of menu cost, popular in New Keynesian macroeconomics. Also, in economics and game theory there is the notion of an Epsilon-equilibrium, which is a generalization of the standard Nash equilibrium in which each player is within ε of his or her optimal payoff (the standard Nash-equilibrium being the special case where ε = 0).

=== Endogenous aspiration levels ===
What determines the aspiration level may be derived from past experience (some function of an agent's or firm's previous payoffs), or some organizational or market institutions. For example, if we think of managerial firms, the managers will be expected to earn normal profits by their shareholders. Other institutions may have specific targets imposed externally (for example state-funded universities in the UK have targets for student recruitment).

An economic example is the Dixon model of an economy consisting of many firms operating in different industries, where each industry is a duopoly. The endogenous aspiration level is the average profit in the economy. This represents the power of the financial markets: in the long-run firms need to earn normal profits or they die (as Armen Alchian once said, "This is the criterion by which the economic system selects survivors: those who realize positive profits are the survivors; those who suffer losses disappear"). We can then think what happens over time. If firms are earning profits at or above their aspiration level, then they just stay doing what they are doing (unlike the optimizing firm which would always strive to earn the highest profits possible). However, if the firms are earning below aspiration, then they try something else, until they get into a situation where they attain their aspiration level. It can be shown that in this economy, satisficing leads to collusion amongst firms: competition between firms leads to lower profits for one or both of the firms in a duopoly. This means that competition is unstable: one or both of the firms will fail to achieve their aspirations and hence try something else. The only situation which is stable is one where all firms achieve their aspirations, which can only happen when all firms earn average profits. In general, this will only happen if all firms earn the joint-profit maximizing or collusive profit.

== In personality and happiness research ==
Some research has suggested that satisficing/maximizing and other decision-making strategies, like personality traits, have a strong genetic component and endure over time. This genetic influence on decision-making behaviors has been found through classical twin studies, in which decision-making tendencies are self-reported by each member of a twinned pair and then compared between monozygotic and dizygotic twins. This implies that people can be categorized into "maximizers" and "satisficers", with some people landing in between.

The distinction between satisficing and maximizing not only differs in the decision-making process, but also in the post-decision evaluation. Maximizers tend to use a more exhaustive approach to their decision-making process: they seek and evaluate more options than satisficers do to achieve greater satisfaction. However, whereas satisficers tend to be relatively pleased with their decisions, maximizers tend to be less happy with their decision outcomes. This is thought to be due to limited cognitive resources people have when their options are vast, forcing maximizers to not make an optimal choice. Because maximization is unrealistic and usually impossible in everyday life, maximizers often feel regretful in their post-choice evaluation.

== In survey methodology ==
As an example of satisficing, in the field of social cognition, Jon Krosnick proposed a theory of statistical survey satisficing which says that optimal question answering by a survey respondent involves a great deal of cognitive work and that some people would use satisficing to reduce that burden. Some people may shortcut their cognitive processes in two ways:

- Weak satisficing: Respondent executes all cognitive steps involved in optimizing, but less completely and with bias.
- Strong satisficing: Respondent offers responses that will seem reasonable to the interviewer without any memory search or information integration.

Likelihood to satisfice is linked to respondent ability, respondent motivation and task difficulty.

Regarding survey answers, satisficing manifests in:

- choosing explicitly offered no-opinion or 'don't know' response option
- choosing socially desirable responses
- non-differentiation or straight-lining when a battery of questions asks for ratings of multiple objects on the same response scale
- acquiescence response bias, which is the tendency to agree with any assertion, regardless of its content
- selecting the first reasonable looking option
- randomly selecting a response
- skipping items
- abandoning the survey or terminating the survey early
- rushing on online surveys
- choosing minimally acceptable answers when verbal answers are required

== See also ==
- Alpha–beta pruning
- Decision theory
- Flipism
- Frame problem
- Homo economicus
- Optimal stopping
- Optimism bias
- Overchoice
- Perfect is the enemy of good
- Portmanteau
- Principle of good enough
- Rational ignorance
- Rationality
- Satisfaction paradox
- Satisfiability
- Utility maximization problem
