= Regret =

Negative emotional reaction to personal past acts

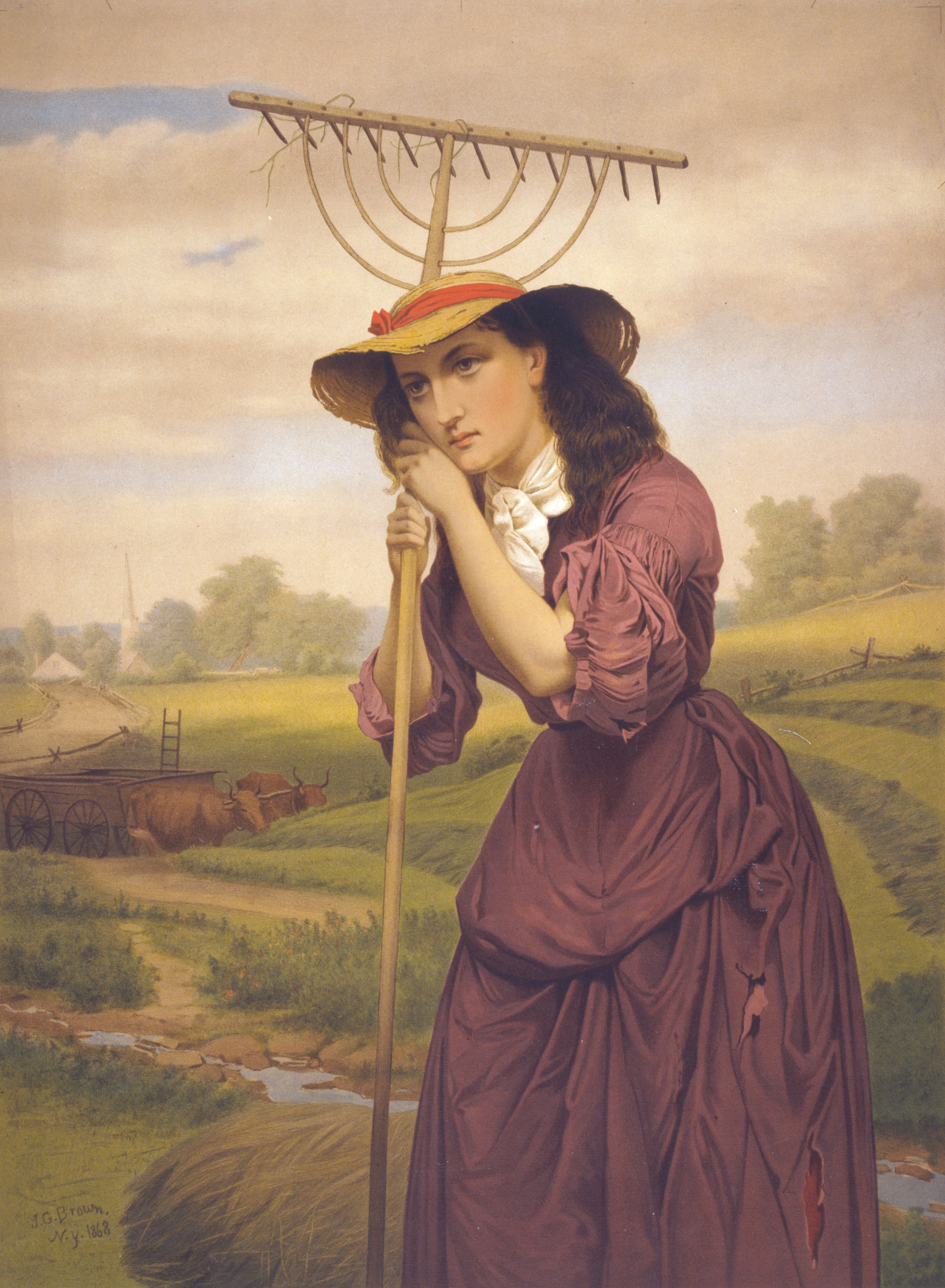
John Greenleaf Whittier's fictional heroine Maud Muller gazes into the distance, regretting her inaction and thinking about what might have been.

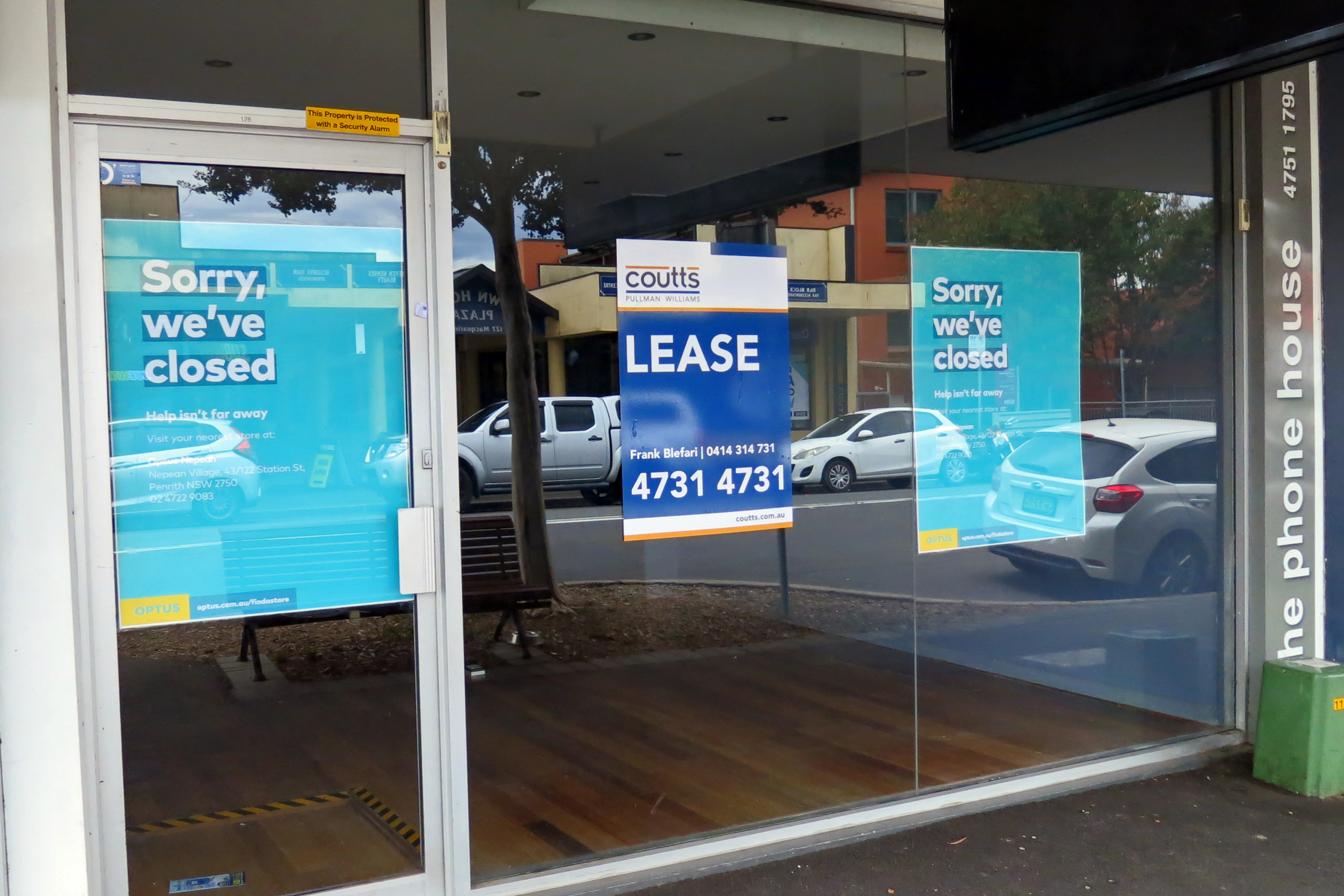
Apologizing for a store closure, showing regret or remorse

Regret is the emotion of wishing one had made a different decision in the past, because the consequences of the decision one did make were unfavorable.

Regret is related to perceived opportunity. Its intensity varies over time after the decision, in regard to action versus inaction, and in regard to self-control at a particular age. The self-recrimination which comes with regret is thought to spur corrective action and adaptation.

In Western societies, education is the life domain in which adults experience the highest regrets, followed by career, romance, parenting, self-improvement, and leisure.

== Definition ==
Regret has been defined by psychologists in the late 1990s as a "negative emotion predicated on an upward, self-focused, counterfactual inference". Another definition is "an aversive emotional state elicited by a discrepancy in the outcome values of chosen vs. unchosen actions".

Regret differs from remorse in that people can regret things beyond their control, but remorse indicates a sense of responsibility for the situation. For example, a person can feel regret that people die during natural disasters, but cannot feel remorse for that situation. However, a person who intentionally harms someone could feel remorse for those actions. Agent regret is the idea that a person could be involved in a situation, and regret their involvement even if those actions were innocent, unintentional, or involuntary. For example, if someone decides to die by stepping in front of a moving vehicle, the death is not the fault of the driver, but the driver may still regret that the person died.

Regret is distinct from disappointment. Both are negative emotional experiences relating to a loss outcome, and both have similar neuronal correlates. However, they differ in regard to feedback about the outcome, comparing the difference between outcomes for the chosen vs. unchosen action; In regret, full feedback occurs and with disappointment partial feedback. They also differ in regard to agency (self in regret versus external in disappointment).

== Models ==
There are conceptual models of regret in regret (decision theory) mostly in theoretical economics and finance under a field called behavioral economics. Anticipated regret, or how much regret one thinks one will feel in the future, appears to be overestimated for actions and choices. This appears to be, in part, due to a tendency to underestimate the extent to which people attribute bad outcomes to external factors rather than to internal factors (i.e., themselves). It can lead to inaction or inertia and omission bias.

Existential regret has been specifically defined as "a profound desire to go back and change a past experience in which one has failed to choose consciously or has made a choice that did not follow one's beliefs, values, or growth needs".

Instruments to measure regret in people having to make medical decisions have failed to address current concepts of regret and failed to differentiate regret from disappointment. They have also not looked for positive impacts of regret. Process regret may occur, if a person does not consider information about all available choices before making a decision.

People will go out of their way to avoid regret which is called regret aversion. This can aid in the decisions one will make. However, many will go to extreme measures to avoid having to feel regret. In the book "Thinking, Fast and Slow" by Daniel Kahneman, many topics relate to regret. System one and system two thinking are systems in the mind that explain different ways people think. System one thinking is quicker and involves less effort of the mind, while system two thinking is slower and involves more effort of the mind. In both these systems, the desire to avoid regret and other negative feelings can be seen in the way decisions are made and the way people think.

Loss aversion is a part of regret and regret aversion due to the way people put in the effort to not lose something. It is believed that losing something has a stronger emotional pull than gaining something does. However, this may not always be true. In 2020, a study published by three people in the Department of Psychology at King's College London researched loss aversion and how it might affect making decisions. The study suggests that depending on the circumstances and experiences loss aversion could be inaccurate.

== Life domains ==
A 2005 meta-analysis of 9 studies (7 US, one Germany, one Finland) about what adults regret most concluded, that overall adults regret choices regarding their education the most. Subsequent rankings included decisions about career, romance, and parenting. Education has been the forerunner of regret in the U.S. per Gallup surveys in 1949, 1953, and 1965. Education was the forerunner of regret because it is seen as something where circumstances could be changed: "In contemporary society, education is open to continual modification throughout life. With the rise of community colleges and student aid programs in recent decades, education of some sort is accessible to nearly all socioeconomic groups." This finding can be attributed to the principle of perceived opportunity. People's biggest regrets are a reflection of where in life they see their largest opportunities; that is, where they see tangible prospects for change, growth, and renewal.

In other cultures, regrets may be ranked differently depending on the perceived opportunity in a particular society.

=== In health care decisions ===
A 2016 review of past studies found risk factors for people to develop "decision regret" regarding their health care were: higher decisional conflict, lower satisfaction with the decision, adverse outcomes in physical health, and greater anxiety levels.

=== Deathbed regrets ===
A 2018 study found that people were more likely to express "ideal-related regrets", such as failing to follow their dreams and live up to their full potential. This was found to correlate with the anecdotal accounts of palliative care nurse Bronnie Ware about the most common regrets she had heard expressed by those nearing death, which included:

1. "I wish I'd had the courage to live a life true to myself, not the life others expected of me."
2. "I wish I hadn't worked so hard."
3. "I wish I'd had the courage to express my feelings."
4. "I wish I had stayed in touch with my friends."
5. "I wish that I had let myself be happier."

== Determinants of intensity ==
=== Action versus inaction ===
There is an interplay between action versus inaction and time. Regrets of an action are more intense in the short term, whereas regrets of inaction are more intense over the long term.

=== Age ===
In a 2001 study, high intensity of regret and intrusive thoughts in older adults was related to self-control, and low internal control was expected to be self-protective and help to decrease regret. In younger adults, internal-control facilitated active change and was associated with low intensity of regret.

=== Opportunity ===
People's biggest regrets occur where they perceive the greatest and most important opportunity for corrective action. When no opportunity exists to improve conditions, thought processes mitigate the cognitive dissonance caused by regret, e.g. by rationalization, and reconstrual. Regret pushes people toward revised decision making and corrective action as part of learning that may bring improvement in life circumstances. A 1999 study measured regret in accordance to negative reviews with service providers. Regret was an accurate predictor of who switched providers. As more intense regret is experienced, the likelihood of initiating change is increased. Consequently, the more opportunity of corrective action available, the larger the regret felt and the more likely corrective action is achieved. Feeling regret spurs future action to make sure other opportunities are taken so that regret will not be experienced again. People learn from their mistakes.

=== Lost opportunity principle ===
With a lost opportunity regret should intensify, not diminish, when people feel that they could have made better choices in the past but now perceive limited opportunities to take corrective action in the future. "People who habitually consider future consequences (and how they may avoid future negative outcomes) experience less, rather than more, intense regret after a negative outcome." This principle offers another reason as to why education is the most regretted aspect in life. Education becomes a more limited opportunity as time passes. Aspects such as making friends, becoming more spiritual, and community involvement tend to be less regrettable which makes sense because these are also aspects in life that do not become limited opportunities. As the opportunity to remedy a situation passes, feelings of hopelessness may increase. An explanation of the lost opportunity principle can be seen as a lack of closure: Low closure makes past occurrences feel unresolved. Low closure is associated with "reductions in self-esteem and persistent negative affect over time" and with the realization and regret of lost opportunity. High closure is associated with acceptance of lost opportunity.

The lost opportunity principle suggests, that regret does not serve as a corrective motive (which the opportunity principle suggests). Instead, regret serves as a more general reminder to seize the day.

Regret lingers where opportunity existed, with the self-blame of remorse being a core element to ultimately spur corrective action in decision-making.

== Neuroscience ==
Research upon brain injury and fMRI have linked the orbitofrontal cortex to the processing of regret.

Completeness of feedback about the outcomes after making a decision determined whether persons experienced regret (outcomes from both the choice and the alternative) vs. disappointment (partial-feedback, seeing only the outcome from the choice) in a magnetoencephalography study. Another factor was the type of agency: With personal decision making the neural correlates of regret could be seen, with external agency (computer choice) those of disappointment. Feedback regret showed greater brain activity in the right anterior and posterior regions, with agency regret producing greater activity in the left anterior region. Both regret and disappointment activated anterior insula and dorsomedial prefrontal cortex but only with regret the lateral orbitofrontal cortex was activated.

Psychopathic individuals do not show regret or remorse. This was thought to be due to an inability to generate this emotion in response to negative outcomes. However, a study found that psychopathic people experience regret but did not use the regret to guide their choice in behavior.

== In other species ==
A study published in 2014 by neuroscientists based at the University of Minnesota suggested that rats are capable of feeling regret about their actions. This emotion had never previously been found in any other mammals apart from humans. Researchers set up situations to induce regret, and rats expressed regret through both their behavior and specific neural patterns in brain activity.

In 2013, a study published by two people in the Department of Evolutionary Anthropology at Duke University analyzed the relationship between decisions and outcomes with emotional reactions in the actions of primates such as chimpanzees and bonobos. The findings were that bonobos were more likely to try to change their decision after an outcome had been undesirable and less likely to decide on a risky option. The outcomes would affect their next decision. Chimpanzees were found to not change their reaction to an outcome even after a decision had led to something undesirable. This has led the researchers to believe that some primates, including bonobos and chimpanzees, are more susceptible to feelings of regret that can cause them to alter their display in certain behaviors.

== See also ==
- Apology
- Loss aversion
