= Perfect is the enemy of good =

Aphorism commonly attributed to Voltaire

"Perfect is the enemy of good" is an aphorism that means insistence on perfection often prevents implementation of good improvements. The phrase suggests that achieving absolute perfection may be impossible, and that the pursuit of perfection should not prevent someone from recognizing or completing work that is imperfect yet still valuable.

== Origin ==
In the English-speaking world the aphorism is commonly attributed to Voltaire, who quoted an Italian proverb in his Questions sur l'Encyclopédie in 1770: "Il meglio è l'inimico del bene". It subsequently appeared in his moral poem, La Bégueule, which starts:

Dans ses écrits, un sage Italien
Dit que le mieux est l'ennemi du bien.

Translation:

In his writings, a wise Italian
says that the best is the enemy of the good.

Previously, around 1726, in his Pensées, Montesquieu wrote "Le mieux est le mortel ennemi du bien" ('The best is the mortal enemy of the good').

== Antecedents ==
Aristotle and other classical philosophers propounded the principle of the golden mean which counsels against extremism in general.

Its sense in English literature can be traced back to Shakespeare. In his tragedy King Lear (1606), the Duke of Albany warns of "striving to better, oft we mar what's well" and in Sonnet 103:

Were it not sinful then, striving to mend,
To mar the subject that before was well?

== Variations ==
The 1893 Dictionary of Quotations from Ancient and Modern, English and Foreign Sources lists a similar proverb, which it claims is of Chinese provenance: "Better a diamond with a flaw than a pebble without one".

More recent applications include Robert Watson-Watt propounding a "cult of the imperfect", which he stated as "Give them the third best to go on with; the second best comes too late, the best never comes"; economist George Stigler's assertion that "If you never miss a plane, you're spending too much time at the airport"; and, in the field of computer program optimization, Donald Knuth's statement that "Premature optimization is the root of all evil". In marketing, the concept of "quality creep" is also recognised as counterproductive. In the 2023 film Blackberry, Mike Lazaridis (played by Jay Baruchel) rebuttals the quote by saying that “good enough is the enemy of humanity”.

== See also ==
- Gold plating (project management)
- Bert Lance § If it ain't broke, don't fix it
- KISS principle
- Nirvana fallacy
- Satisficing
- Utopia
- Wabi-sabi
- Worse is better
