= Computer Othello =

Abstract strategy game

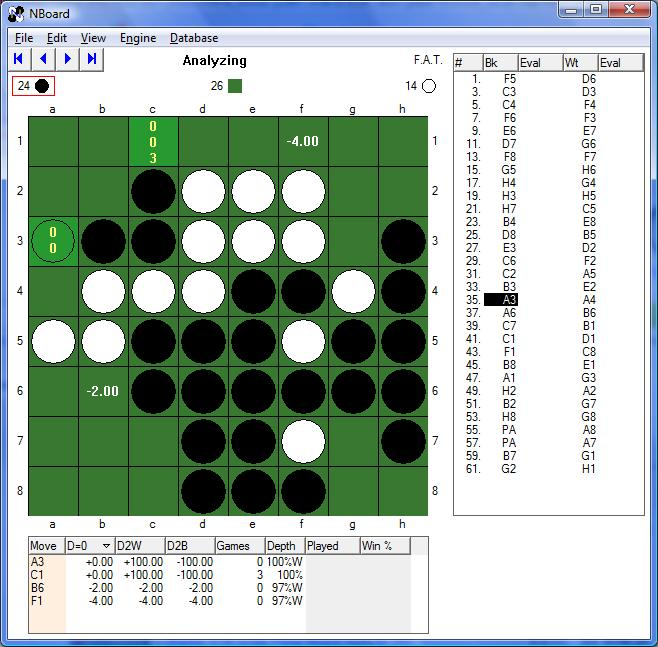
- NTest - a strong othello program

Computer Othello refers to computer architecture encompassing computer hardware and computer software capable of playing the game of Othello. A version of Othello was famously included in Microsoft Windows from version 1.0 to XP, where it is simply known as Reversi.

== Availability ==
There are many Othello programs such as NTest, Saio, Edax, Cassio, Pointy Stone, Herakles, WZebra, and Logistello that can be downloaded from the Internet for free. These programs, when run on any up-to-date computer, can play games in which the best human players are easily defeated. This is because although the consequences of moves are predictable for both computers and humans, computers are better at exploring them.

== Search techniques ==
Computer Othello programs search for any possible legal moves using a game tree. In theory, they examine all positions / nodes, where each move by one player is called a "ply". This search continues until a certain maximum search depth or the program determines that a final "leaf" position has been reached.

A naive implementation of this approach, known as Minimax or Negamax, can only search to a small depth in a practical amount of time, so various methods have been devised to greatly increase the speed of the search for good moves. These are based on Alpha-beta pruning, Negascout, MTD(f), and NegaC*. The alphabeta algorithm is a method for speeding up the Minimax searching routine by pruning off cases that will not be used anyway. This method takes advantage of the fact that every other level in the tree will maximize and every other level will minimize.

Several heuristics are also used to reduce the size of the searched tree: good move ordering, transposition table and selective Search.

To speed up the search on machines with multiple processors or cores, a "parallel search" may be implemented. Several experiments have been made with the game Othello, like ABDADA or APHID On recent programs, the YBWC seems the preferred approach.

=== Multi-Prob cut ===
Multi-ProbCut is a heuristic used in alpha–beta pruning of the search tree. The ProbCut heuristic estimates evaluation scores at deeper levels of the search tree using a linear regression between deeper and shallower scores. Multi-ProbCut extends this approach to multiple levels of the search tree. The linear regression itself is learned through previous tree searches, making the heuristic a kind of dynamic search control. It is particularly useful in games such as Othello where there is a strong correlation between evaluations scores at deeper and shallower levels.

== Evaluation techniques ==
There are three different paradigms for creating evaluation functions.

=== Disk-square tables ===
Different squares have different values - corners are good and the squares next to corners are bad. Disregarding symmetries, there are 10 different positions on a board, and each of these is given a value for each of the three possibilities: black disk, white disk and empty. A more sophisticated approach is to have different values for each position during the different stages of the game; e.g. corners are more important in the opening and early midgame than in the endgame.

=== Mobility-based ===
Most human players strive to maximize mobility (number of moves available) and minimize frontier disks (disks adjacent to empty squares). Player mobility and opponent mobility are calculated, and player potential mobility and opponent potential mobility are calculated as well. These measures can be found very quickly, and they significantly increase playing strength. Most programs have knowledge of edge and corner configurations and try to minimize the number of disks during the early midgame, another strategy used by human players.

=== Pattern-based / pattern coefficients ===
Mobility maximization and frontier minimization can be broken down into local configurations which can be added together; the usual implementation is to evaluate each row, column, diagonal and corner configuration separately and add together the values, many different patterns have to be evaluated. The process of determining values for all configurations is done by taking a large database of games played between strong players and calculating statistics for each configuration in each game stage from all the games.

The most common choice to predict the final disc difference uses a weighted disk difference measure where the winning side gets a bonus corresponding to the number of disks.

== Opening book ==
Opening books aid computer programs by giving common openings that are considered good ways to counter poor openings. All strong programs use opening books and update their books automatically after each game. To go through all positions from all games in the game database and determine the best move not played in any database game, transposition tables are used to record positions that have been previously searched. This means those positions do not need to be searched again. This is time-consuming as a deep search must be performed for each position, but once this is done, updating the book is easy. After each game played, all new positions are searched for the best deviation.

== Other optimizations ==
Faster hardware and additional processors can improve Othello-playing program abilities, such as deeper ply searching.

== Solving Othello ==
During gameplay, players alternate moves. The human player uses black counters while the computer uses white. The human player starts the game. Othello is strongly solved on 4×4 and 6×6 boards, with the second player (white) winning in perfect play.

=== Othello 4 × 4 ===
Othello 4x4 has a very small game tree and has been solved in less than one second by many simple Othello programs that use the Minimax method, which generates all possible positions (nearly 10 million). The result is that white wins with a +8 margin (3–11).

=== Othello 6 × 6 ===
Othello 6x6 has been solved in less than 100 hours by many simple Othello programs that use the Minimax method, which generates all possible positions (nearly 3.6 trillion). The result is that white wins with a +4 margin (16–20).

=== Othello 8 × 8 ===
The Othello 8x8 game tree size is estimated at 10^{54} nodes, and the number of legal positions is estimated at less than 10^{28}. As of October 2023, a preprint claims that the game has been solved, with optimal result being draw. Computation results is also shared, making it one of the largest publicly available books.

Some top programs have expanded their books for many years now. As a result, many lines are in practice draws or wins for either side. Regarding the three main openings of diagonal, perpendicular and parallel, it appears that both diagonal and perpendicular openings lead to drawing lines, while the parallel opening is a win for black. The drawing tree also seems bigger after the diagonal opening than after the perpendicular opening. The parallel opening has strong advantages for the black player, enabling black to always win in a perfect play.

== Milestones in computer Othello ==
	a	b	c	d	e	f	g	h
1	a1X	b1X	c1X	d1X	e1X	f1X	g1X	h1X	1
2	a2X	b2X	c2O	d2X	e2X	f2X	g2X	h2X	2
3	a3X	b3X	c3X	d3O	e3X	f3X	g3O	h3X	3
4	a4X	b4X	c4O	d4X	e4X	f4O	g4X	h4X	4
5	a5X	b5X	c5X	d5X	e5X	f5X	g5X	h5X	5
6	a6X	b6X	c6X	d6O	e6X	f6X	g6X	h6X	6
7	a7X	b7X	c7O	d7O	e7O	f7X	g7X	h7X	7
8	a8X	b8X	c8X	d8X	e8X	f8X	g8X	h8X	8
	a	b	c	d	e	f	g	h

Logistello vs. Takeshi Murakami (4th Game)
- 1977: Scientific American made the earliest known published reference to an Othello/Reversi program, written by N. J. D. Jacobs in BCPL. BYTE published "Othello, a New Ancient Game" as a BASIC type-in program in October.
- 1977: Creative Computing published a version of Othello written by Ed Wright in FORTRAN.
- 1978: Nintendo releases the video game Computer Othello in arcades.
- 1980: The Othello program The Moor (written by Mike Reeve and David Levy) won one game in a six-game match against world champion Hiroshi Inoue. Peter W Frey of Northwestern University discussed computer and human Othello strategies in BYTE, and discussed his TRS-80 Othello game which, Frey claimed, easily defeated Wright's version running on a CDC 6600. Paul Rosenbloom of Carnegie Mellon University developed IAGO, which finished in third place at a Northwestern University computer tournament. When IAGO played The Moor, IAGO was better at capturing pieces permanently and limiting its opponent's mobility.
- 1981: IAGO running on a DEC KA10 finished ahead of 19 other contestants at the Santa Cruz Open Othello Tournament at the University of California, Santa Cruz, with the only undefeated record. Charles Heath's TRS 80-based game finished in second place. Microcomputer CPU-based engines won the second through seventh places, ahead of several mainframes and minicomputers; Frey speculated that this was because computer Othello does not benefit from several of the advantages of larger computers, such as faster floating-point arithmetic.
- Late 1980s: Kai-Fu Lee and Sanjoy Mahajan created the Othello program BILL, which was similar to IAGO but incorporated Bayesian learning. BILL reliably beat IAGO.
- 1992: Michael Buro began work on the Othello program Logistello. Logistello's search techniques, evaluation function, and knowledge base of patterns were better than those in earlier programs. Logistello perfected its game by playing over 100,000 games against itself.
- 1997: Logistello won every game in a six-game match against world champion Takeshi Murakami. Though there had not been much doubt that Othello programs were stronger than humans, it had been 17 years since the last match between a computer and a reigning world champion. After the 1997 match, there was no longer any doubt: Logistello was significantly better than any human player.
- 1998: Michael Buro retired Logistello. Research interest in Othello waned somewhat, but some programs, including Ntest, Saio, Edax, Cassio, Zebra and Herakles, continued to be developed.
- 2004: Ntest became the strongest program, significantly stronger than Logistello.
- 2005: Ntest, Saio, Edax, Cyrano and Zebra, became significantly stronger than Logistello. Ntest and Zebra retired.
- 2011: Saio, Edax and Cyrano, became much faster than Logistello and other programs.
- 2022: Egaroucid appears as strong engine highly inspired by Edax.
- 2023: Othello is solved using slightly modified Edax. Egaroucid releases self-play data.
- 2026 egaroucid, Kalmia, Melody and ymatioun take the lead in AI tournaments

== List of top Othello/ Reversi programs ==
1. Egaroucid
2. Edax (Edax) by Richard Delorme
3. NTest (Ntest) by Chris Welty
4. WZebra
5. Logistello (Logistello) by Michael Buro

== See also ==
- Computer Go
- Computer shogi
- Computer chess
- Computer Olympiad
- Reversi
