= Mind sport =

Game of skill based on intellectual ability

A mind sport is a game of skill in which the outcome is determined primarily by intellectual ability rather than physical effort. Mind sports typically require strategic thinking, concentration, memory, logic, pattern recognition, planning, decision-making, and mental effort. They are often played in competitive settings with formal rules or unofficial codes of conduct, rankings, governing bodies, and international championships.

The term became widely used in the late 20th century, especially after the creation of the Mind Sports Olympiad in 1997. Since then, mind sports have gained broader recognition through organizations such as the International Mind Sports Association (IMSA), which governs major international competitions in games such as chess, bridge, draughts, go, xiangqi.

Mind sports can include board games, card games, abstract strategy games, memory competitions, puzzle solving, and other activities in which mental performance is the primary factor. Chess and contract bridge are among the best known examples and are recognized by the International Olympic Committee as sports. Other activities commonly described as mind sports include go, draughts, poker, mahjong, shogi, xiangqi, renju, Scrabble, speedcubing, and memory sports.

Although mind sports generally involve less physical activity than traditional sports, many players and organizations argue that they should be treated similarly because of the high level of preparation, discipline, training, and competition involved. International tournaments in mind sports often attract participants from dozens of countries and can include world championships, continental championships, and multi-sport events.

== Overview ==
Mind sports are a category of competitive activities in which the primary objective is to test intellectual ability, strategic thinking, memory, or mental calculation, rather than physical prowess. The term gained prominence with the establishment of the Mind Sports Olympiad in 1997, which organized multiple games under the concept of "Olympics for the mind".

Mind sports encompass a wide range of games, including traditional board games such as chess, Go, draughts, backgammon, Mahjong, Shogi, Xiangqi, and Renju. These games require deep concentration, tactical planning, and long-term strategic thinking. Chess, for example, can involve several hours of continuous calculation and analysis at high levels of play.

Card games such as bridge and poker are also classified as mind sports. Success in these games depends on strategy, probability assessment, and partnership coordination in the case of bridge. Other activities like Rubik’s Cube solving, Sudoku, speed reading, competitive programming, memory sports, and e-sports further expand the mind sports family, emphasizing problem-solving, rapid calculation, or memorization skills.

The International Mind Sports Association (IMSA) acts as the global governing body for recognized mind sports including bridge, chess, draughts, Go, Mahjong, and Xiangqi. Also, chess and bridge are members of the Association of IOC Recognised International Sports Federations, while the Global Association of International Sports Federations also recognizes chess, bridge, Go, and draughts, lending them official sporting credibility. In 2017, the international poker federation gained observer status, paving the way for official recognition as a mind sport.

Mind sports have appeared on multi-sport programs, including the 2010 Asian Games in Guangzhou, which featured chess, Xiangqi, and Go tournaments, and the 2018 Asian Games, which included contract bridge. These developments have fueled discussion on the potential inclusion of mind sports in future Olympic events.

== Sports ==
Mind sports encompass a variety of competitive activities that require intellectual skill, strategic thinking, memory and analytical ability.

Chess is one of the most widely recognized mind sports, with structured international championships and millions of active players who compete in a variety of formats including classical, rapid and blitz. Chess requires considering possible scenarios that could occur a number of moves in the future to decide the optimal move, often under time pressure.

Contract bridge is a trick‑taking card game played in partnerships that combines memory, communication and strategy; it has a global competitive circuit and is formally recognized as a mind sport with international federations and world championships.

Go and draughts are strategic board games with long histories that have evolved into modern competitive mind sports with professional tournaments spanning many countries.

Many other sports also fall under the umbrella of mind sports with organized competitions that emphasize problem‑solving and cognitive skill.

=== List of mind sports ===
The following games are commonly described as mind sports in reliable independent sources. They are distinguished from casual or purely recreational games by having structured international competition, governing bodies, official world or continental championships, ranking systems, and a primary emphasis on cognitive skill rather than physical performance. Inclusion may also be supported by recognition from international mind sports organisations or participation in events such as the Mind Sports Olympiad or World Mind Sports Games.

Mind sports	Governing bodies	World championships
Chess	FIDE	World Chess Championship
Contract bridge	World Bridge Federation	World Bridge Championships
Draughts	World Draughts Federation	World Draughts Championship
Go	International Go Federation	World Amateur Go Championship
Mahjong	World Mahjong Organization	World Mahjong Championship
Poker	World Poker Federation	World Series of Poker Main Event
Renju	Renju International Federation	World Renju Championship
Reversi	World Othello Federation	World Othello Championship
Shogi	FESA	World Open Shogi Championship
Speedcubing	World Cube Association	World Rubik's Cube Championship
Xiangqi	World Xiangqi Federation	World Xiangqi Championship

== History ==
Mind sports have developed as structured competitive disciplines that emphasize intellectual skill, strategy, memory and mental agility rather than physical ability. One of the earliest organized multi‑event mind sports competitions was the Mind Sports Olympiad, first held in London in 1997, which brought together dozens of games such as chess, bridge, sudoku, memory and creative thinking under a single competitive framework.

The concept of uniting mind sports on a global stage continued into the 21st century with the creation of the International Mind Sports Association (IMSA) in 2005, an umbrella organization for federations representing bridge, chess, draughts, go and xiangqi, aimed at promoting international collaboration and potentially establishing a mind‑sports counterpart to the Olympic Games.

In 2008 and 2012, World Mind Sports Games were organized in Beijing and Lille, bringing together thousands of competitors from more than 90 countries in five major mind sports — bridge, chess, draughts, go and xiangqi — shortly after the Summer Olympics to demonstrate global reach and competitive depth.

== Etymology ==
The first major use of the term was as a result of the Mind Sports Olympiad in 1997. The phrase had been used prior to this event such as backgammon being described as a mind sport by Tony Buzan in 1996; Tony Buzan was also a co-founder of the Mind Sports Olympiad. Bodies such as the World Memory Sports Council use the term retrospectively.

It is a term that became fixed from games trying to obtain equal status to sports. For example, from 2002 British Minister for Sport, Richard Caborn said:

...I believe we should have the same obligation to mental agility as we do to physical agility. Mind sports have to form UK national bodies and get together with the government to devise an acceptable amendment to the 1937 Act that clearly differentiates mind sports from parlour board games.

Many of the games' official bodies which had come together for the Mind Sports Olympiad, formed larger organisations such as the Mind Sports Council and International Mind Sports Association (IMSA). With IMSA organising the World Mind Sports Games in Beijing 2008 for contract bridge, chess, go, draughts and xiangqi many other bodies have lobbied for inclusion such as the International Federation of Poker, which won provisional membership at the annual congress of SportAccord in Dubai in 2009.

The term also includes mental calculation or memory disciplines as presented in International competitions such as the Mental Calculation World Cup (held bi-annually since 2004) and the World Memory Championships (held annually since 1991).

== Other games called mind sports ==
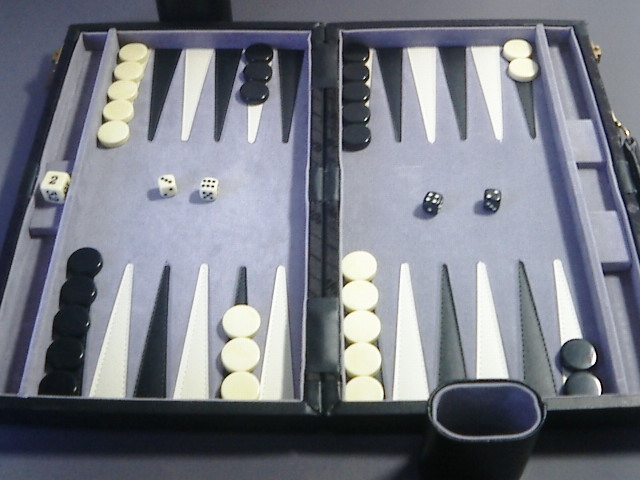
The board game of backgammon has been described as a mind sport.

As well as board and card games, other disciplines that have been described as mind sports are speed reading, quizzing, competitive programming, and cybersecurity wargames. Other events that have been included where the physical element is comparable to the mental component such as when the official Mind Sports South Africa accepted speed-texting as a mind sport. The World Mind Sports Federation additionally classifies esports as mind sports.

== See also ==
- Games of mental skill
- International Mathematical Olympiad
- International Olympiad in Informatics
- International Science Olympiad
- List of Go organizations
- List of world championships in mind sports
  - World Chess Championship
  - World Bridge Championships
  - Backgammon World Championship
  - World Xiangqi Championship
  - World Memory Championships
  - Extreme Memory Tournament
  - World Puzzle Championship
  - World Rubik's Cube Championships
  - World Sudoku Championship
  - World Quizzing Championship
  - World Jigsaw Puzzle Championships
- Mensa Mind Games
