= Variation (game tree) =

Specific sequence of moves in a game

A variation can refer to a specific sequence of successive moves in a turn-based game, often used to specify a hypothetical future state of a game that is being played. Although the term is most commonly used in the context of Chess analysis, it has been applied to other games. It also is a useful term used when describing computer tree-search algorithms (for example minimax) for playing games such as Go or Chess.

A variation can be any number of steps as long as each step would be legal if it were to be played. It is often as far ahead as a human or computer can calculate; or however long is necessary to reach a particular position of interest. It may also lead to a terminal state in the game, in which case the term "winning variation" or "losing variation" is sometimes used.

== Principal variation ==
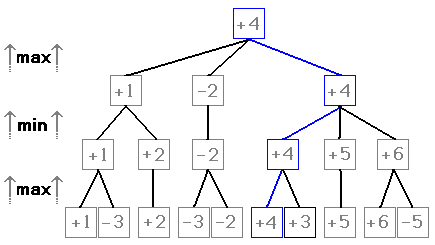
The principal variation of this minimax game tree is shown in blue

The principal variation refers to the particular variation that is the most advantageous to the current player, assuming each other player will respond with the move that best improves their own position. In other words, it is the "best" or "correct" line of play. In the context of tree-searching game artificial intelligence – in which this term is most common – it may also refer to the sequence of moves that is currently believed to be the most advantageous, but is not guaranteed due to the technical limitations of the algorithm.

== See also ==
- Game tree
- Backtracking
- Minimax
- Negamax
- Alpha-beta pruning
- Negascout
