= Alexander Reinefeld =

German computer scientist

Alexander Reinefeld (born 1957) is a German computer scientist and games researcher. He is the head of computer science at Zuse Institute Berlin. His contributions to the field include the NegaScout algorithm.

== Biography ==
Alexander Reinefeld studied physics at the Technical University of Braunschweig and computer science at the University of Hamburg and during two one-year visits in Edmonton at the University of Alberta. In 1982 he concluded his Diplom (equivalent to MSc) in computer science and in 1987 he received his Ph.D at the University of Hamburg.

From 1983 to 1987, he worked as a scientific employee, and from 1989 to 1992 as assistant at the University of Hamburg. During the years 1987 to 1990 he collected industrial experience as a management consultant in the areas of systems analysis, databases and compiler building. In 1992 Reinefeld collaborated with the Paderborn Center for Parallel Computing (PC²) at the University of Paderborn. Since 1998, Alexander Reinefeld leads the area of Computer Science in the Zuse Institute Berlin (ZIB). He is a member of the Gesellschaft für Informatik, the ACM, the IEEE Computer Society, the German university association Deutscher Hochschulverband (DHV) and Chair of Parallel and Distributed Systems at the Humboldt University of Berlin.

== Search algorithms ==
In 1983 Alexander Reinefeld introduced the NegaScout search-algorithm, an improvement of Judea Pearl's Scout.

Ten years later, in 1993 Reinefeld made an attempt to resuscitate Stockman's SSS* algorithm, and proposed an improvement of the recursive RecSSS*, initially developed by Subir Bhattacharya and Amitava Bagchi. Despite promising results with some trees of depth 8, the space (memory) requirements were still too high, and with the research of Aske Plaat, Wim Pijls and Arie de Bruin concerning the alpha–beta pruning algorithm with zero windows and transposition table in SSS* and Dual* as MT, SSS* was finally declared "dead" by Pijls and De Bruin in 1996.

== Chess programs ==
In 1979 at the University of Hamburg, motivated and supported by his advisor Frieder Schwenkel, Alexander Reinefeld designed the chess program Murks, partly implemented in microcode for an Interdata M85 minicomputer. Reinefeld claimed that world chess champion Mikhail Botvinnik played against Murks during his visit.

In 1980/81, a team of four students, Manfred Allers, Dirk Hauschildt, Dieter Steinwender and Alexander Reinefeld, ported Murks to a Motorola 68000 microprocessor, then dubbed MicroMurks. They built their own MC68000 microcomputer from scratch. Micromurks II represented by Dieter Steinwender, participated at the WMCCC 1983 in Budapest.
