= World Othello Championship =

The World Othello Championship (WOC) is the annual world championship tournament in the board game Othello, organised by the World Othello Federation (WOF) and its member national federations. The first WOC was held in Tokyo in 1977 with representatives from five countries, and has since grown into an international competition attracting players from dozens of nations around the world.

== Overview ==
The World Othello Championship typically takes place over several days and determines titles including the World Othello Champion, the Women’s World Othello Champion, the Youth World Othello Champion, and team champions. The tournament format usually includes multiple rounds of play where competitors meet in a Swiss or round‑robin system to determine final standings.

The championship is open to players from all WOF member nations, with federations entitled to send a set number of competitors. In recent years the number of participants has reached around 90–100 players, reflecting the growing global interest in competitive Othello. The event is also often hosted in conjunction with other WOF activities such as annual general meetings or confederation events.

== History ==
The first World Othello Championship was contested in Tokyo, Japan in 1977, with Hiroshi Inoue becoming the inaugural world champion. Early editions of the tournament featured a small number of competitors, but by the late 1980s the event expanded to include players from over 20 countries and added team competition categories.

Throughout its history, the World Othello Championship has been hosted in a variety of countries and regions. For example, the 2024 championship was held in Hangzhou, China, where Seiya Kurita emerged as the World Othello Champion after finishing atop the standings in a field of international competitors.

Over time the organisation of the championship became more formalised under the World Othello Federation, which was established in 2005 to promote the game worldwide and oversee international competitions. The WOF continues to coordinate the annual championship along with regional and confederation Othello events to foster competitive play at all levels.

== Results ==
The World Othello Championship (WOC), which started in 1977, was first organized by the Japan Othello Association. From 1978 until 2004, the World Othello Championship was organized by the Othello TD group and Anjar Co. In 2005, the World Othello Federation took over the responsibility for the WOC.

From 1977 to 1986, each country could send one player to participate in the WOC. From 1987, each country could send up to three players to participate. In 1987, the title WOC team championship started. In 2005, a female championship category was added to the WOC. From 2006, each World Othello Federation member could send a full team of up to four players. In 2016, a youth champion title was added to the WOC. The WOC was cancelled in 2020 and 2021 due to the COVID-19 pandemic.

Year	Location	World Champion	Team	Runner-up	Female Champion	Youth Champion
1977	Tokyo	(Japan) Hiroshi Inoue	—N/a	(Norway) Thomas Heiberg	—N/a	—N/a
1978	New York City	(Japan) Hidenori Maruoka	—N/a	(United States) Carol Jacobs	—N/a	—N/a
1979	Rome	(Japan) Hiroshi Inoue	—N/a	(United States) Jonathan Cerf	—N/a	—N/a
1980	London	(United States) Jonathan Cerf	—N/a	(Japan) Takuya Mimura	—N/a	—N/a
1981	Brussels	(Japan) Hidenori Maruoka	—N/a	(United States) Brian Rose	—N/a	—N/a
1982	Stockholm	(Japan) Kunihiko Tanida	—N/a	(United States) David Shaman	—N/a	—N/a
1983	Paris	(Japan) Ken'Ichi Ishii	—N/a	(United Kingdom) Imre Leader	—N/a	—N/a
1984	Melbourne	(France) Paul Ralle	—N/a	(Japan) Ryoichi Taniguchi	—N/a	—N/a
1985	Athens	(Japan) Masaki Takizawa	—N/a	(Italy) Paolo Ghirardato	—N/a	—N/a
1986	Tokyo	(Japan) Hideshi Tamenori	—N/a	(France) Paul Ralle	—N/a	—N/a
1987	Milan	(Japan) Ken'Ichi Ishii	United States	(France) Paul Ralle	—N/a	—N/a
1988	Paris	(Japan) Hideshi Tamenori	United Kingdom	(United Kingdom) Graham Brightwell	—N/a	—N/a
1989	Warsaw	(Japan) Hideshi Tamenori	United Kingdom	(United Kingdom) Graham Brightwell	—N/a	—N/a
1990	Stockholm	(Japan) Hideshi Tamenori	France	(France) Didier Piau	—N/a	—N/a
1991	New York City	(Japan) Shigeru Kaneda	United States	(France) Paul Ralle	—N/a	—N/a
1992	Barcelona	(France) Marc Tastet	United Kingdom	(United Kingdom) David Shaman	—N/a	—N/a
1993	London	(United States) David Shaman	United States	(France) Emmanuel Caspard	—N/a	—N/a
1994	Paris	(Japan) Masaki Takizawa	France	(Denmark) Karsten Feldborg	—N/a	—N/a
1995	Melbourne	(Japan) Hideshi Tamenori	United States	(United States) David Shaman	—N/a	—N/a
1996	Tokyo	(Japan) Takeshi Murakami	United Kingdom	(France) Stéphane Nicolet	—N/a	—N/a
1997	Athens	(Japan) Makoto Suekuni	United Kingdom	(United Kingdom) Graham Brightwell	—N/a	—N/a
1998	Barcelona	(Japan) Takeshi Murakami	France	(France) Emmanuel Caspard	—N/a	—N/a
1999	Milan	(Netherlands) David Shaman	Japan	(Japan) Tetsuya Nakajima	—N/a	—N/a
2000	Copenhagen	(Japan) Takeshi Murakami	United States	(United States) Brian Rose	—N/a	—N/a
2001	New York City	(United States) Brian Rose	United States	(United States) Raphael Schreiber	—N/a	—N/a
2002	Amsterdam	(Netherlands) David Shaman	United States	(United States) Ben Seeley	—N/a	—N/a
2003	Stockholm	(United States) Ben Seeley	Japan	(Japan) Makoto Suekuni	—N/a	—N/a
2004	London	(United States) Ben Seeley	United States	(Japan) Makoto Suekuni	—N/a	—N/a
2005	Reykjavík	(Japan) Hideshi Tamenori	Japan	(South Korea) Kwangwook Lee	(Japan) Hisako Kinoshita	—N/a
2006	Mito	(Japan) Hideshi Tamenori	Japan	(Singapore) Makoto Suekuni	(Japan) Toshimi Tsuji	—N/a
2007	Athens	(Japan) Kenta Tominaga	Japan	(France) Stéphane Nicolet	(Japan) Yukiko Tatsumi	—N/a
2008	Oslo	(Italy) Michele Borassi	Japan	(Japan) Tamaki Miyaoka	(Germany) Liya Ye	—N/a
2009	Ghent	(Japan) Yusuke Takanashi	Japan	(Germany) Matthias Berg	(Japan) Mei Urashima	—N/a
2010	Rome	(Japan) Yusuke Takanashi	Japan	(Italy) Michele Borassi	(Netherlands) Jiska Helmes	—N/a
2011	Newark	(Japan) Hiroki Nobukawa	Japan	(Thailand) Piyanat Aunchulee	(United States) Jian Cai	—N/a
2012	Leeuwarden	(Japan) Yusuke Takanashi	Japan	(Japan) Kazuki Okamoto	(Sweden) Veronica Stenberg	—N/a
2013	Stockholm	(Japan) Kazuki Okamoto	Japan	(Thailand) Piyanat Aunchulee	(Finland) Katie Wu	—N/a
2014	Bangkok	(Japan) Makoto Suekuni	Japan	(United States) Ben Seeley	(Australia) Joanna William	—N/a
2015	Cambridge	(Japan) Yusuke Takanashi	Japan	(Japan) Makoto Suekuni	(United States) Yoko Sano Rose	—N/a
2016	Mito	(Thailand) Piyanat Aunchulee	Japan	(China) Yan Song	(China) Zhen Dong	(Japan) Masaki Wada
2017	Ghent	(Japan) Yusuke Takanashi	Japan	(Japan) Akihiro Takahashi	(Japan) Misa Sugawara	(Japan) Akihiro Takahashi
2018	Prague	(Japan) Keisuke Fukuchi	Japan	(Thailand) Piyanat Aunchulee	(Japan) Misa Sugawara	(Japan) Keisuke Fukuchi
2019	Tokyo	(Japan) Akihiro Takahashi	Japan	(Japan) Yusuke Takanashi	(Australia) Joanna William	(Japan) Akihiro Takahashi
2020	Cancelled					
2021	Cancelled					
2022	Paris	(Japan) Kento Urano	Japan	(Switzerland) Arthur Juigner	(Finland) Katie Pihlajapuro	(Japan) Fuyumi Okudaira
2023	Rome	(Japan) Yasushi Nagano	Japan	(Thailand) Rujipas Aunchulee	(Japan) Hisako Kinoshita	(Japan) Osuke Kawazoe
2024	Hangzhou	(Japan) Seiya Kurita	Japan	(Japan) Yusuke Takanashi	(Japan) Hisako Kinoshita	(Japan) Yo Tomita
2025	Ankara	(Japan) Seiya Kurita	Japan	(Japan) Yusuke Takanashi	(Japan) Miu Hisamatsu	(Singapore) Calvin Koh Ding Sheng
