= NTest =

Program for playing Reversi

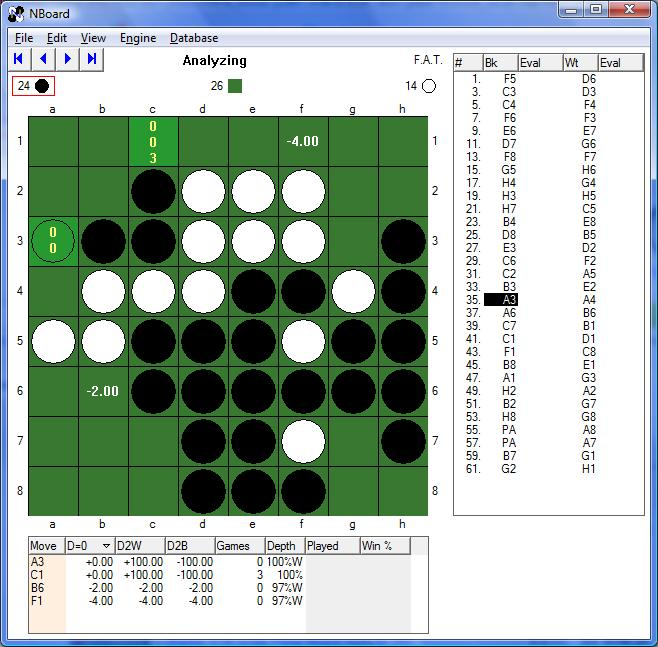

NTest is a free Othello/Reversi program created by Chris Welty (not to be confused with the other computer scientist named Chris Welty who worked on the IBM Watson project).

NTest is a strong Othello program with a high-quality evaluation function and fast search algorithms. It has many features, with the most important one being the display of the search evaluation for all possible moves. NTest is among the strongest free Othello/Reversi programs in the world. It can generate bitboard-based moves performing parallel computational searches across multiple CPU cores.

Other programs' opening books—such as Edax's book—can be used in NBoard, the GUI created by Chris Welty for NTest.
