= Graham Brightwell =

British mathematician

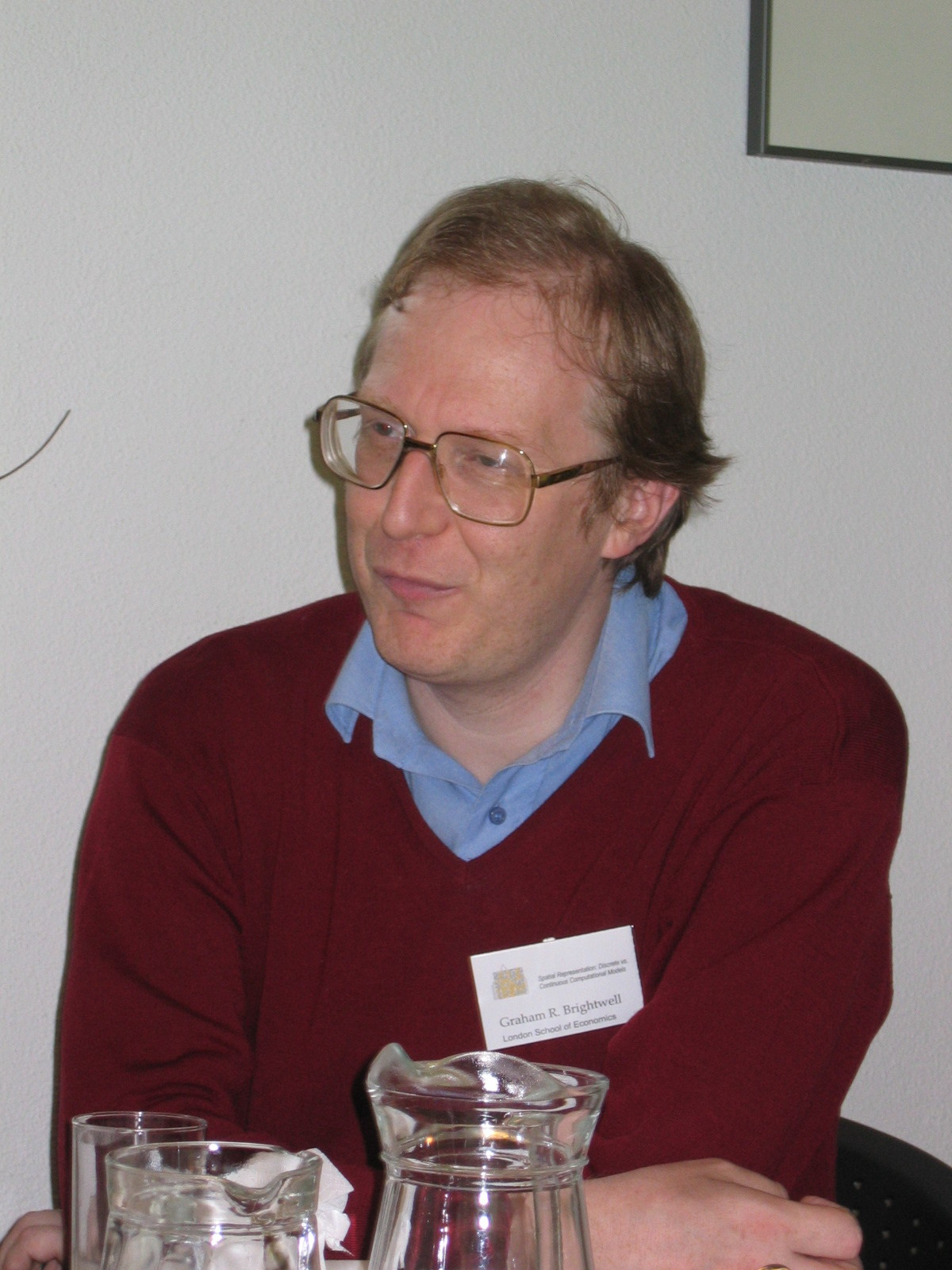
- Education: University of Cambridge
- Known for: Discrete Mathematics
- Scientific career
- Fields: Mathematics
- Workplaces: London School of Economics
- Doctoral advisor: Béla Bollobás

Graham Brightwell is a British mathematician working in the field of discrete mathematics.

A professor at the London School of Economics, he has published nearly 100 papers in pure mathematics, including over a dozen with Béla Bollobás. His research interests include random combinatorial structures; partially ordered sets; algorithms; random graphs; discrete mathematics and graph theory. (Bollobás supervised his PhD on "Linear Extensions of Partially Ordered Sets" at Cambridge, awarded 1988.)

== Othello ==
Brightwell started playing Othello in 1985, after finding himself sharing an apartment with fellow mathematician and Othello player Imre Leader. He has finished three times as runner-up in the World Othello Championship and is a 5-time British Champion, and has served as chairman of the British Othello Federation and as editor of the British Othello Newsletter. He created the Brightwell Quotient, often used in Othello tournaments, to resolve ties.
