= Othello Quarterly =

The Othello Quarterly (OQ) was the journal of the United States Othello Association, and was dedicated to the modern version of the game whose generic name is Reversi. It was published from 1979 to 2005.

From 1984 to 1986 Ted Landau was editor of the OQ which was based in Falls Church, Virginia.
