= Gamma-minimax inference =

In the statistical decision theory, where one is faced with making decisions in the presence of statistical knowledge, Γ-minimax inference is a minimax approach used to deal with partial prior information. It works with applications of Γ-minimax to statistical estimation, and contains Γ-minimax theory, used to pick applicable decision rules to use when given partial prior information about the distribution of an unknown parameter. The decision rule selected must be the one that minimizes the supremum of the payoff over the priors in Γ, with Bayes and regret risk prioritized in a frequentist approach, and posterior expected loss and regret prioritized in a Bayesian one.

== History ==
The Γ-minimax principle has been discussed and proposed before by Herbert Robbins. and I. J. Good to deal with instances of partial prior information that can arise from the minimax approach pioneered by Abraham Wald.
