= Béla Bollobás =

Hungarian mathematician (born 1943)

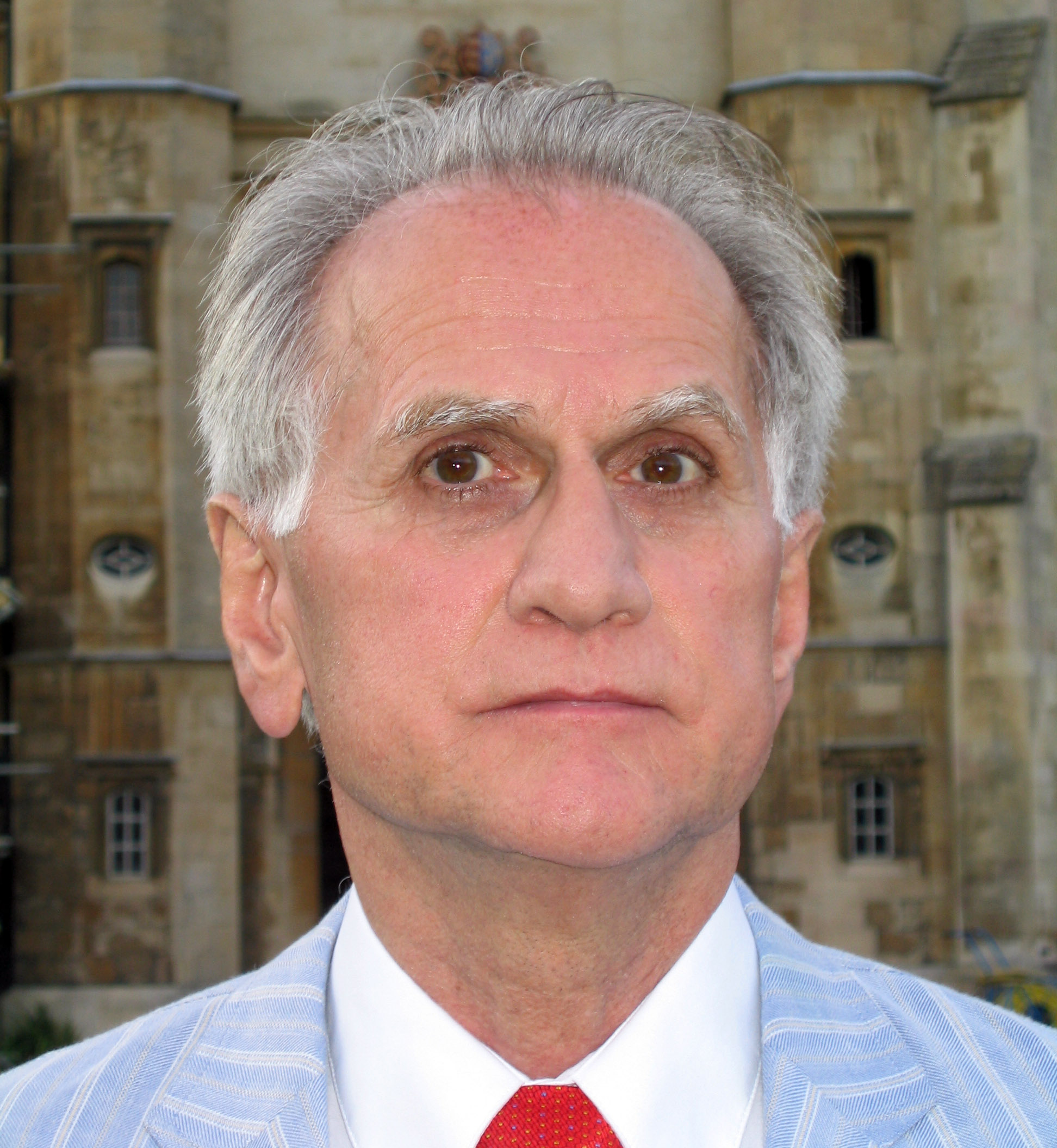
- Born: 3 August 1943 (age 83); Budapest, Hungary
- Education: Eötvös Loránd University; Trinity College, Cambridge
- Known for: Functional analysis combinatorics Extremal graph theory percolation theory graph polynomials
- Spouse: Gabriella Bollobás
- Awards: Senior Whitehead Prize (2007); Bocskai Prize (2015); Széchenyi Prize (2017)
- Scientific career
- Fields: Mathematics; Random graphs Extremal graph theory
- Workplaces: Eötvös Loránd University; University of Cambridge; University of Memphis
- Doctoral advisor: László Fejes Tóth; Paul Erdős; Frank Adams
- Doctoral students: Keith Ball; József Balogh; Graham Brightwell; Reinhard Diestel; Timothy Gowers; Penny Haxell; Yoshiharu Kohayakawa; Imre Leader; Robert Morris; Jonathan Partington; Charles Read
- Website: royalsociety.org/people/bela-bollobas dpmms.cam.ac.uk/person/bb12/

Béla Bollobás FRS (born 3 August 1943) is a Hungarian-born British mathematician who has worked in various areas of mathematics, including functional analysis, combinatorics, graph theory, and percolation theory. He was strongly influenced by Paul Erdős from the age of 14. He is currently a professor and chair of excellence at the University of Memphis.

== Early life and education ==
While still at high school in Hungary, Bollobás took part in the first three International Mathematical Olympiads, in 1959, 1960, and 1961, winning two gold medals. Paul Erdős invited Bollobás to lunch after hearing about his victories, and they kept in touch. Bollobás's first publication was a joint paper with Erdős, on extremal problems in graph theory, written in 1962 while he was still in high school.

Bollobás became a student of mathematics at Eötvös Loránd University, and with Erdős's recommendation to Harold Davenport (and a long struggle for permission with the Hungarian authorities) was able to spend an undergraduate year at the University of Cambridge, in England. However, the authorities denied his request to return to Cambridge for doctoral study. A similar scholarship offer from Paris was also quashed. He wrote his first doctorate in discrete geometry under the supervision of László Fejes Tóth and Paul Erdős in Budapest University, 1967, after which he spent a year in Moscow with Israïl Moiseevich Gelfand. After spending a year at Christ Church, Oxford, where Michael Atiyah held the Savilian Chair of Geometry, he vowed never to return to Hungary due to his disillusion with the 1956 Soviet intervention. He then went to Trinity College, Cambridge, where in 1972 he received a second PhD in functional analysis, studying Banach algebras under the supervision of Frank Adams. Bollobás recalled, "By then, I said to myself, 'If I ever manage to leave Hungary, I won't return.'" In 1970, he was awarded a fellowship at the college.

His main area of research is combinatorics, particularly graph theory. His chief interests are in extremal graph theory and random graph theory. In 1996 he resigned his university post, but remained a Fellow of Trinity College, Cambridge.

== Career ==
Bollobás has been a Fellow of Trinity College, Cambridge, since 1970; in 1996 he was appointed to the Jabie Hardin Chair of Excellence at the University of Memphis, and in 2005 he was awarded a senior research fellowship at Trinity College.

Bollobás has proved results on extremal graph theory, functional analysis, the theory of random graphs, graph polynomials and percolation. For example, with Paul Erdős he proved results about the structure of dense graphs; he was the first to prove detailed results about the phase transition in the evolution of random graphs; he proved that the chromatic number of the random graph on n vertices is asymptotically n/2 log n; with Imre Leader he proved basic discrete isoperimetric inequalities; with Richard Arratia and Gregory Sorkin he constructed the interlace polynomial; with Oliver Riordan he introduced the ribbon polynomial (now called the Bollobás–Riordan polynomial); with Andrew Thomason, József Balogh, Miklós Simonovits, Robert Morris and Noga Alon he studied monotone and hereditary graph properties; with Paul Smith and Andrew Uzzell he introduced and classified random cellular automata with general homogeneous monotone update rules; with József Balogh, Hugo Duminil-Copin and Robert Morris he studied bootstrap percolation; with Oliver Riordan he proved that the critical probability in random Voronoi percolation in the plane is 1/2; and with Svante Janson and Oliver Riordan he introduced a very general model of heterogeneous sparse random graphs.

In addition to over 350 research papers on mathematics, Bollobás has written several books, including the research monographs Extremal Graph Theory in 1978, Random Graphs in 1985 and Percolation (with Oliver Riordan) in 2006, the introductory books Modern Graph Theory for undergraduate courses in 1979, Combinatorics and Linear Analysis in 1990, and the collection of problems The Art of Mathematics – Coffee Time in Memphis in 2006, with drawings by Gabriella Bollobás. He has also edited a number of books, including Littlewood's Miscellany.

Bollobás's research students have included Keith Ball at Warwick, Graham Brightwell at LSE, Timothy Gowers (who was awarded a Fields Medal in 1998 and is Rouse Ball Professor of Mathematics), Imre Leader at the University of Cambridge, Jonathan Partington at Leeds, Charles Read at Leeds, who died in 2015, and Alexander Scott.

Bollobás is an External Member of the Hungarian Academy of Sciences; in 2007 he was awarded the Senior Whitehead Prize by the London Mathematical Society. In 2011 he was elected a Fellow of the Royal Society for his major contributions to many different areas of mathematics within the broad field of combinatorics, including random graphs, percolation, extremal graphs, set systems and isoperimetric inequalities. The citation also recognises the profound influence of his textbooks in many of these areas, and his key role in establishing Britain as one of the leading countries in probabilistic and extremal combinatorics. In 2012 he became a fellow of the American Mathematical Society.

== Awards and honours ==
Bollobás was elected a Fellow of the Royal Society in 2011. His nomination reads

Béla Bollobás is one of the world's leading mathematicians in combinatorics. He has a huge published output, which includes major contributions to many different branches of this very large area, such as random graphs, percolation, extremal graphs and set systems, isoperimetric inequalities, and more. In addition, through his classic textbooks, he has more or less defined many of these subjects. Britain is now one of the strongest countries for probabilistic and extremal combinatorics in the world: this is almost entirely due to Bollobás's influence.

In 1998 he was an invited speaker of the International Congress of Mathematicians in Berlin. He was elected Foreign Member of the Polish Academy of Sciences in 2013, a Member of the Academy of Europea in 2017 and a member of Academia Brasileira Ciencias (ABC) in 2023. He received an honorary doctorate from Adam Mickiewicz University, Poznań in 2013. In 2016 he received the Bocskai Prize, the Széchenyi Prize in 2017 and the 2023 Friend of Hungary Prize.

== Personal life ==
His father was a physician. His wife, Gabriella Bollobás, born in Budapest, was an actress and a musician in Hungary before moving to England to become a sculptor. She made busts of mathematicians and scientists, including Paul Erdős, Bill Tutte, George Batchelor, John von Neumann, Paul Dirac, and Stephen Hawking, as well as a cast bronze of David Hilbert. He has one son, Mark.

Bollobás is also a sportsman, having represented the University of Oxford at modern pentathlon and the University of Cambridge at fencing.

== Selected works ==
- Extremal Graph Theory. Academic Press 1978, ISBN 978-0-486-43596-1 Dover 2004 (see here).
- Graph theory- an introductory course. Springer 1979,ISBN 978-1-4612-9969-1, doi:10.1007/978-1-4612-9967-7.
- Random Graphs. Academic Press 1985. Cambridge University Press 2001 ISBN 978-0-521-79722-1, doi:10.1017/CBO9780511814068.
- Combinatorics - set systems, hypergraphs, families of vectors, and combinatorial probability. Cambridge University Press 1986 ISBN 978-0-521-33703-8.
- Linear Analysis – an introductory course. Cambridge University Press 1990, 1999 ISBN 978-0-521-65577-4,doi:10.1017/CBO9781139168472.
- with Alan Baker, András Hajnal (ed.): A tribute to Paul Erdös. Cambridge University Press 1990 doi:10.1017/CBO9780511983917,ISBN 978-0-521-60766-7.
- (ed.): Probabilistic combinatorics and its applications. American Mathematical Society 1991 ISBN 978-0-8218-5500-3.
- with Andrew Thomason (ed.): Combinatorics, Geometry and Probability- a tribute to Paul Erdös. Cambridge University Press 1997 doi:10.1017/CBO9780511662034, ISBN 978-0-521-60766-7.
- Modern Graph Theory. Springer 1998, doi:10.1007/978-1-4612-0619-4, ISBN 978-0-387-98488-9.
- (ed.): Contemporary Combinatorics. Springer und Janos Bolyai Mathematical Society, Budapest 2002 ISBN 978-3-642-07660-2.
- with Oliver Riordan: Percolation. Cambridge University Press 2006 doi:10.1017/CBO9781139167383, ISBN 978-0-521-87232-4.
- The Art of Mathematics – Coffee Time in Memphis. Cambridge University Press 2006 doi:10.1017/CBO9780511816574, ISBN 978-0-521-69395-0 (with drawings by his wife Gabrielle Bollobás)
- with Robert Kozma, Dezső Miklós: Handbook of Large-Scale Random Networks. Springer 2009, doi:10.1007/978-3-540-69395-6, ISBN 978-3-540-69394-9.
