= Michael Buro =

American mathematician

- Occupation: Computer Scientist

Michael Buro is a Canadian AI Researcher and the creator of the Skat-playing computer program Kermit, as well as the Othello-playing computer program Logistello.

== Professional career ==
Michael Buro is a professor at the University of Alberta in the Computer Science department. He got his PhD from the University of Paderborn in Computer Science in 1994.

== Contributions ==
Michael Buro received his PhD for his work on Logistello - an Othello program that later defeated the reigning human World champion Takeshi Murakami 6-0 in 1997. The considerable playing strength of Logistello was based on its fast endgame solver, automatic opening book learning, selective alpha-beta search, and its fast and accurate state evaluator that was trained on millions of game positions. Michael's current research interests include heuristic search, machine learning, abstraction, state inference, and agent modelling applied to games. In these areas he and his students have made numerous contributions, ranging from developing fast geometric pathfinding algorithms, over hierarchical search methods, to creating one of the World's best program for Skat - a popular 3-player card game.
