= SSS* =

Game tree search algorithm

SSS* is a search algorithm introduced by George Stockman in 1979. It conducts a state space search traversing a game tree in a best-first fashion similar to that of the A* search algorithm.

SSS* is based on the notion of solution trees. Informally, a solution tree can be formed from any arbitrary game tree by pruning the number of branches at each MAX node to one. Such a tree represents a complete strategy for MAX, since it specifies exactly one MAX action for every possible sequence of moves made by the opponent. Given a game tree, SSS* searches through the space of partial solution trees, gradually analyzing larger and larger subtrees, eventually producing a single solution tree with the same root and Minimax value as the original game tree. SSS* never examines a node that alpha–beta pruning would prune, and may prune some branches that alpha–beta would not. Stockman speculated that SSS* may therefore be a better general algorithm than alpha–beta. However, Igor Roizen and Judea Pearl have shown that the savings in the number of positions that SSS* evaluates relative to alpha/beta is limited and generally not enough to compensate for the increase in other resources (e.g., the storing and sorting of a list of nodes made necessary by the best-first nature of the algorithm). However, Aske Plaat, Jonathan Schaeffer, Wim Pijls and Arie de Bruin have shown that a sequence of null-window alpha–beta calls is equivalent to SSS* (i.e., it expands the same nodes in the same order) when alpha–beta is used with a transposition table, as is the case in all game-playing programs for chess, checkers, etc. Now the storing and sorting of the OPEN list were no longer necessary. This allowed the implementation of (an algorithm equivalent to) SSS* in tournament quality game-playing programs. Experiments showed that it did indeed perform better than Alpha–Beta in practice, but that it did not beat NegaScout.

The reformulation of a best-first algorithm as a sequence of depth-first calls prompted the formulation of a class of null-window alpha–beta algorithms, of which MTD(f) is the best known example.

== Algorithm ==
There is a priority queue OPEN that stores states $(J, s, h)$ or the nodes, where $J$ - node identificator (Dot-decimal notation is used to identify nodes, $\epsilon$ is a root), $s\in\{L,S\}$ - state of the node $J$ (L - the node is live, which means it's not solved yet and S - the node is solved), $h\in(-\infty, \infty)$ - value of the solved node. Items in OPEN queue are sorted descending by their $h$ value. If more than one node has the same value of $h$, a node left-most in the tree is chosen.

OPEN := { (e, L, inf) }
while true do   // repeat until stopped
    pop an element p=(J, s, h) from the head of the OPEN queue
    if J = e and s = S then
        STOP the algorithm and return h as a result
    else
        apply Gamma operator for p

$\Gamma$ operator for $p=(J,s,h)$ is defined in the following way:

if s = L then
    if J is a terminal node then
        (1.) add (J, S, min(h, value(J))) to OPEN
    else if J is a MIN node then
        (2.) add (J.1, L, h) to OPEN
    else
        (3.) for j=1..number_of_children(J) add (J.j, L, h) to OPEN
else
    if J is a MIN node then
        (4.) add (parent(J), S, h) to OPEN
             remove from OPEN all the states that are associated with the children of parent(J)
    else if is_last_child(J) then   // if J is the last child of parent(J)
        (5.) add (parent(J), S, h) to OPEN
    else
        (6.) add (parent(J).(k+1), L, h) to OPEN   // add state associated with the next child of parent(J) to OPEN
