= Games of mental skill =

Type of game

Games of mental skill are games of skill in which success depends primarily on intellectual ability rather than physical effort. They usually involve strategy, logic, memory, concentration, planning, calculation, pattern recognition, or problem solving.

Games of mental skill can be played individually or competitively and may include board games, card games, abstract strategy games, puzzle games, memory competitions, word games, and other forms of structured mental activity.

== Overview ==
The term is broader than mind sport, which generally refers to organized competitive activities with formal governing bodies, rankings, and championships. While all mind sports are games of mental skill, not all games of mental skill are considered mind sports. For example, crossword puzzles, Sudoku, escape-room puzzles, trivia games, and many educational games may require considerable intellectual ability without being recognized as formal sports.

Games of mental skill may involve complete information, as in chess or go, or hidden information, as in poker and contract bridge. Some games emphasize long-term strategy, while others rely more on memory, deduction, or quick thinking. Competitive forms often develop formal rules, rating systems, and organized tournaments over time.

Common examples of games of mental skill include chess, draughts, go, contract bridge, poker, shogi, xiangqi, mahjong, Scrabble, Sudoku, crossword puzzles, Rubik's Cube solving, memory competitions, and various logic-based video games. Some of these activities have international federations and world championships, while others remain informal recreational activities.

== Sea also ==
- Games of skill
- Mind sport
- Esport
