= Goro Hasegawa =

Japanese board game designer

Goro Hasegawa (19 October 1932 – 20 June 2016) was a Japanese game designer known for creating the board game Othello.

== Biography ==
Born in Mito, Ibaraki Prefecture, Hasegawa created the strategy game Othello around 1949 while a high school student in Mito, Ibaraki Prefecture. Hasegawa was an enthusiast of the traditional game Go, and he developed a prototype of Othello using Go stones and milk-bottle tops. The distinctive black and white discs were inspired by Go pieces. He named this new game "Othello", a name inspired by the Shakespearean play.

After graduating, Hasegawa worked for a medical company. In 1973, he successfully pitched the game to Japanese toy company Tsukuda Corporation, which mass-produced it. The game became popular in Japan, and Hasegawa facilitated its growth by organizing tournaments and serving as head of the national Othello association.

At his death, Hasegawa resided in Kashiwa, Japan. During his lifetime, he authored several books on Othello strategy.
