= Charles Read (mathematician) =

British mathematician

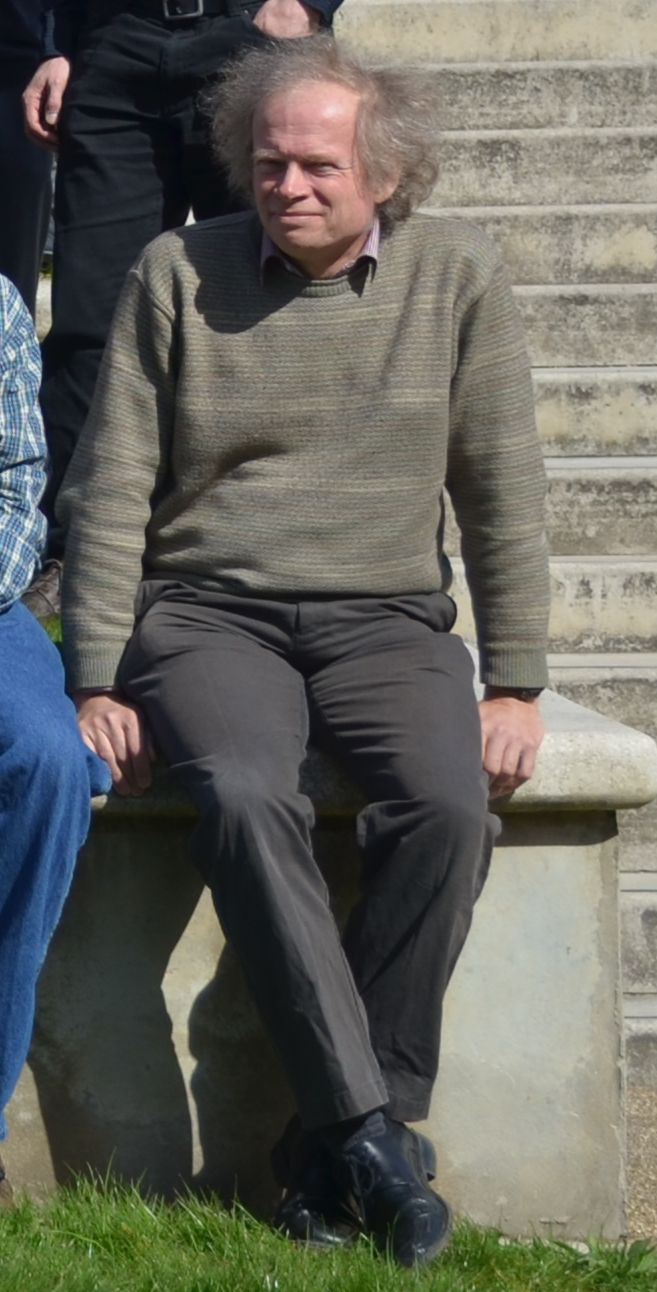
Charles Read

Charles John Read (16 February 1958 – 14 August 2015) was a British mathematician known for his work in functional analysis. In operator theory, he is best known for his work in the 1980s on the invariant subspace problem, where he constructed operators with only trivial invariant subspaces on particular Banach spaces, especially on $\ell_1$. He won the 1985 Junior Berwick Prize for his work on the invariant subspace problem.

Read has also published on Banach algebras and hypercyclicity; in particular, he constructed the first example of an amenable, commutative, radical Banach algebra.

== Education and career ==
Read won a scholarship to study mathematics at Trinity College, Cambridge in October 1975, and was awarded a first-class degree in Mathematics in 1978. He completed his PhD thesis entitled Some Problems in the Geometry of Banach Spaces at the University of Cambridge under the supervision of Béla Bollobás. He spent the year 1981–82 at Louisiana State University. From 2000 until his death, he was a Professor of Pure Mathematics at the University of Leeds after having been a fellow of Trinity College for several years.

== Personal life ==
=== Christianity ===
On his personal website, formerly hosted on a server at the University of Leeds, Read described himself first and foremost as a Born-Again Christian. Some biographical details could be found in what he described as his "Christian Testimony" on that site, where he described his conversion process.

He described losing his father to cancer in 1970 when he was 11 years old, and that this loss prompted him to ask questions about whether, and in what form, we might continue to live after we die - and that consciousness may be independent of the body. He came to the conclusion that the conscious mind must survive after death. This also led him to believe that since we are "immortal beings" that we must always try to "do the right thing".

Some time later the article described an incident where he had pushed a smaller boy out of the way in a queue at a sweet shop. He later interpreted his later sense of remorse at having done something wrong as the "Classical Christian conviction of sin", and claimed to have had a religious experience on a London Underground train where he felt a sense of joy at being forgiven, and simultaneously bursting into tears.

Read also claimed to have taken part in a miracle of Christian healing at a Christian meeting run by John Wimber, organiser of the Vineyard Movement.

==== Controversy over Read's Christian Testimony ====
An article in The Gryphon, the Leeds University Student Union newspaper, in February 2015 stated that Read had "sparked controversy" by stating at the end of his testimony that "I strongly urge you to seek the truth as a researcher, not trusting anyone else to do your basic investigations for you. That’s right, Jesus is the Way. But you have to find that out for yourself. For those who seek find, but those who can’t be bothered, or who think they’re too cool, end in a very dark place. It won't be cool in Hell."

The article was prompted by a third-year Maths student who had expressed the opinion that "I don’t think his university webpage should be showing his personal opinions about faith and religion as it doesn’t have anything to do with someone’s ability to learn maths".

Read subsequently displayed on his website a scanned image of the original article, under which a handwritten comment notes that "Leeds Gryphon, 13-2-15 notices Christian Testimony of CJR after several years!"

=== Cave diving ===
Read was also a devotee of solo cave diving and wrote extensively about it on his website.

== Death ==
Read died in Winnipeg in August 2015 while on a research visit at the University of Manitoba.
