= Logistello =

Computer program

Logistello is a computer program that plays the game Othello, also known as Reversi. Logistello was written by Michael Buro and is regarded as a strong player, having beaten the human world champion Takeshi Murakami six games to none in 1997 — the best Othello programs are now much stronger than any human player. Logistello's evaluation function is based on disc patterns and features over a million numerical parameters which were tuned using linear regression.

== See also ==
- Computer Othello
