= Rubik's Cube World Championship =

International Rubik's Cube speedcubing competition

- Sport: Speedcubing
- Founded: 1982
- Organising body: World Cube Association

The Rubik's Cube World Championship is the premier international competition in speedcubing, bringing together the fastest cubers from around the world to compete in standardized timed solves of the Rubik’s Cube and other twisty puzzles. The event has become the most prestigious title in the sport of speedcubing and has contributed to the global growth of competitive puzzle‑solving as both a community and discipline.

== History ==
The first official Rubik’s Cube World Championship took place on 5 June 1982 in Budapest, Hungary, where competitors from 19 countries participated and American cuber Minh Thai won with a best recorded time of 22.95 seconds in the 3×3×3 event. This event is widely recognized as the inaugural world championship in speedcubing history.

After decades without an official competition, the World Championship was revived in 2003 at the Ontario Science Center in Toronto, Canada, with 83 participants. This marked the beginning of the modern competitive era and led to the formation of the World Cube Association (WCA) in 2004, which now governs and standardizes official cubing competitions worldwide.

Since 2005, World Championships have generally been held every two years under WCA governance, growing in scale and categories to include multiple puzzle types and attracting competitors and spectators from across the globe.

== Significance ==
The Rubik’s Cube World Championship has played a crucial role in shaping speedcubing as a competitive discipline with structured rules, official records, and a supportive global community, contributing to its recognition both within and outside cubing circles.

The championship events receive international attention through news coverage, highlighting record‑breaking achievements and personal stories of dedication among participants, illustrating the widespread cultural and educational interest in the sport.

Academic research also uses the Rubik’s Cube and its competitive community to explore cognitive performance, collective intelligence, and skill learning in complex tasks, showing that competitive cubing contributes to scientific understanding beyond mere recreation.

== Format ==
Competitions at the World Championships follow rules and formats defined by the World Cube Association, including standardized scrambling procedures and timed solve measurement systems such as trimmed averages, ensuring official results and records are comparable across events.

== List of championships ==
No.	Year	Dates	Host	Events	Competitors	Ref / Notes
1	1982	5 June	(Hungary) Budapest	1	19	
2	2003	23–24 August	(Canada) Toronto	14	88	
3	2005	5–6 November	(United States) Orlando	15	149	
4	2007	5–7 October	(Hungary) Budapest	17	214	
5	2009	9–11 October	(Germany) Düsseldorf	19	327	
6	2011	14–16 October	(Thailand) Bangkok	19	292	
7	2013	26–28 July	(United States) Las Vegas	17	580	
8	2015	17–19 July	(Brazil) São Paulo	18	428	
9	2017	13–16 July	(France) Paris	18	938	
10	2019	11–14 July	(Australia) Melbourne	18	833	
11	2021	28–31 December	(Netherlands) Almere	17	–	Cancelled
12	2023	12–15 August	(South Korea) Incheon	17	1187	
13	2025	3–6 July	(United States) Seattle	17	1864	
