= Imre Leader =

British Othello player (born 1963)

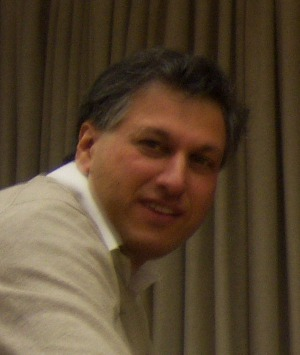
- Born: 30 October 1963 (age 62)
- Education: Cambridge University
- Awards: Whitehead Prize (1999)
- Scientific career
- Fields: Combinatorics
- Thesis: Discrete Isoperimetric Inequalities and Other Combinatorial Results (1989)
- Doctoral advisor: Béla Bollobás

Imre Bennett Leader (born 30 October 1963) is a British mathematician, a professor in DPMMS at the University of Cambridge working in the field of combinatorics. He is also known as an Othello player.

== Life ==
He is the son of the physicist Elliot Leader and his first wife Ninon Neményi (his mother was previously married to the poet Endre Kövesi); Darian Leader is his brother. Imre Lakatos was a family friend and his godfather.

Leader was educated at St Paul's School in London, from 1976 to 1980. He won a silver medal on the British team at the 1981 International Mathematical Olympiad (IMO) for pre-undergraduates. He later acted as the official leader of the British IMO team, taking over from Adam McBride in 1999, to 2001. He was the IMO's Chief Coordinator and Problems Group Chairman in 2002.

Leader went on to Trinity College, Cambridge, where he graduated B.A. in 1984, M.A. in 1989, and Ph.D. in 1989. His Ph.D. in mathematics was for work on combinatorics, supervised by Béla Bollobás. From 1989 to 1996 he was Fellow at Peterhouse, Cambridge, then was Reader at University College London from 1996 to 2000. He was a lecturer at Cambridge from 2000 to 2002, and Reader there from 2002 to 2005. In 2000 he became a Fellow of Trinity College.

== Awards and honours ==
In 1999 Leader was awarded a Junior Whitehead Prize for his contributions to combinatorics. Cited results included the proof, with Reinhard Diestel, of the bounded graph conjecture of Rudolf Halin.

== Othello ==
Leader in an interview in 2016 stated that he began to play Othello in 1981, with his friend Jeremy Rickard. In the years from 1982 and 2022 he was 16 times the British Othello champion. In 1983 he came second in the world individual championship, and in 1988 he played on the British team that won the world team championship.

As of 2026, Leader has won the European Grand Prix Championship six times, most recently in 2023.
