= Reversi =

Strategy board game

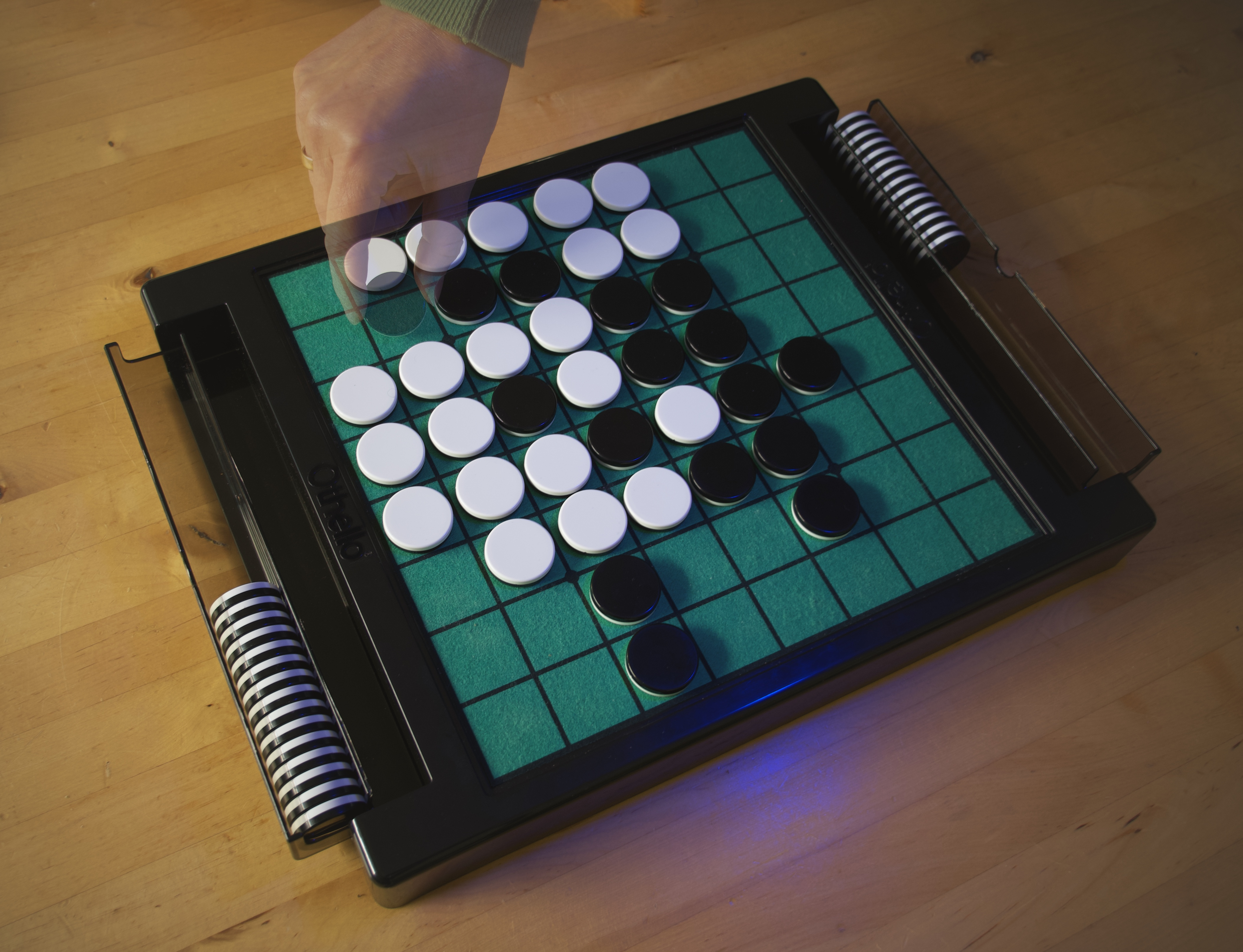
- Othello, a modern variation of Reversi. A semi-transparent hand indicates a possible move by the player with the black pieces.
- Years active: 1883; 143 years ago (or earlier)—present
- Genres: Board game; Abstract strategy game; Mind sport
- Players: 2
- Setup time: < 10 seconds
- Playing time: 1–60 minutes
- Chance: None
- Age range: 8+
- Skills: Strategy, tactics, observation
- Synonyms: Othello

Reversi is an abstract strategy board game for two players, played on an 8×8 uncheckered board. It was invented in 1883. Othello, a variant with a fixed initial setup of the board, was patented in 1971.

Two players compete, using 64 identical game pieces ("disks") that are light on one side and dark on the other. Each player chooses one color to use throughout the game. Players take turns placing one disk on an empty square, with their assigned color facing up. After a play is made, any disks of the opponent's color that lie in a straight line bounded by the one just played and another one in the current player's color are turned over. When all playable empty squares are filled, the player with more disks showing in their own color wins the game.

== History ==
=== Original version ===
Englishmen Lewis Waterman and John W. Mollett both claim to have invented the game of reversi in 1883, each denouncing the other as a fraud. The game gained considerable popularity in England at the end of the 19th century. The game's first reliable mention is in the 21 August 1886 edition of The Saturday Review. Later mention includes an 1895 article in The New York Times, which describes reversi as "something like Go Bang, [...] played with 64 pieces." In 1893, the German games publisher Ravensburger started producing the game as one of its first titles. Two 18th-century continental European books dealing with a game that may or may not be reversi are mentioned on page fourteen of the Spring 1989 Othello Quarterly, and there has been speculation, so far without documentation, that the game has older origins.

A Japanese publication in 1907 titled World Games Rules Complete Collection (世界遊戯法大全) describes the board game reversi with the same rules as Othello where the first four pieces go in the center in a diagonal pattern and the player who cannot make a move simply passes, rather than immediately losing the game.

=== Othello ===
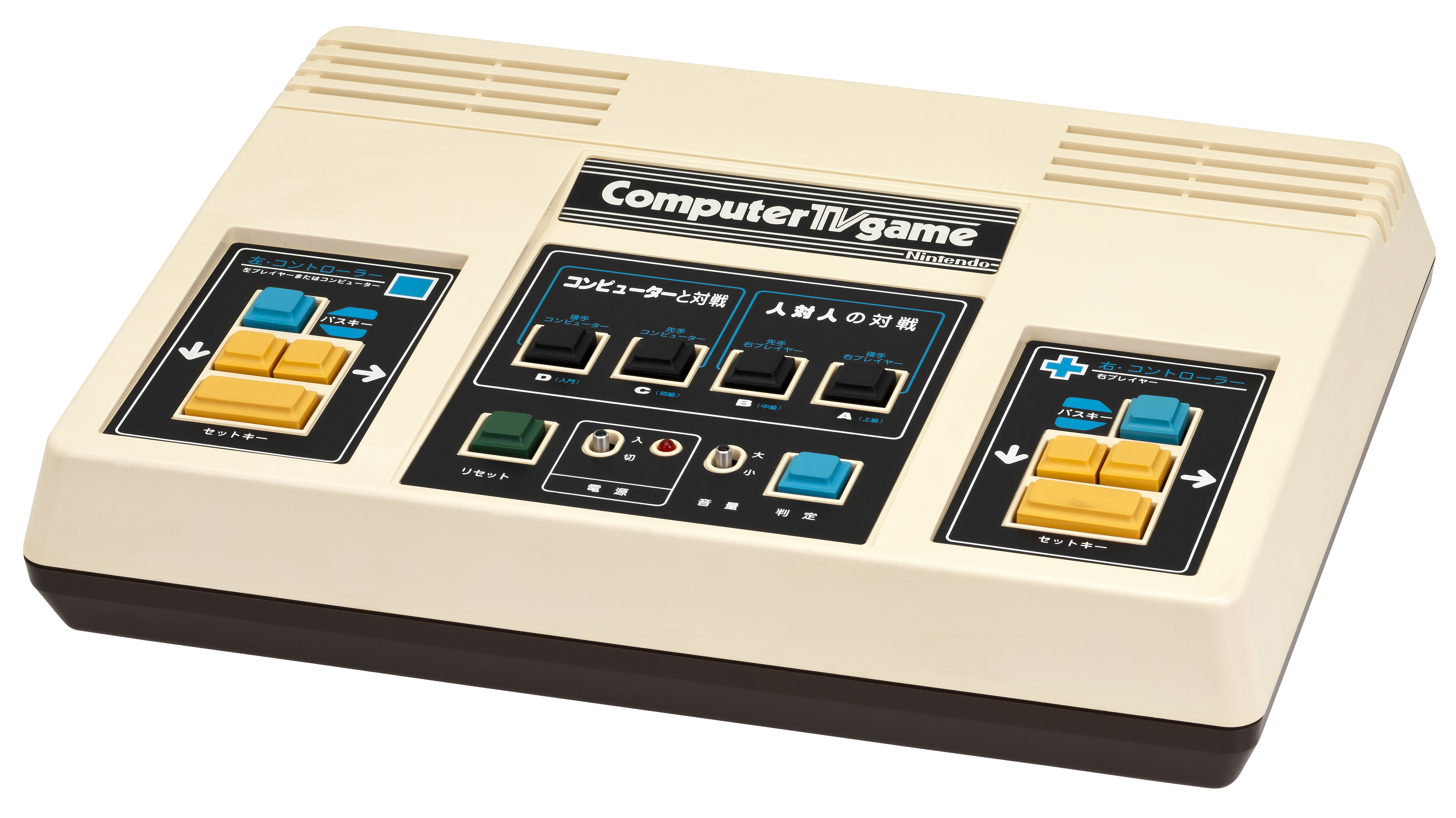
Othello was one of Nintendo's first arcade games, and it was later adapted to the Color TV-Game in 1980.

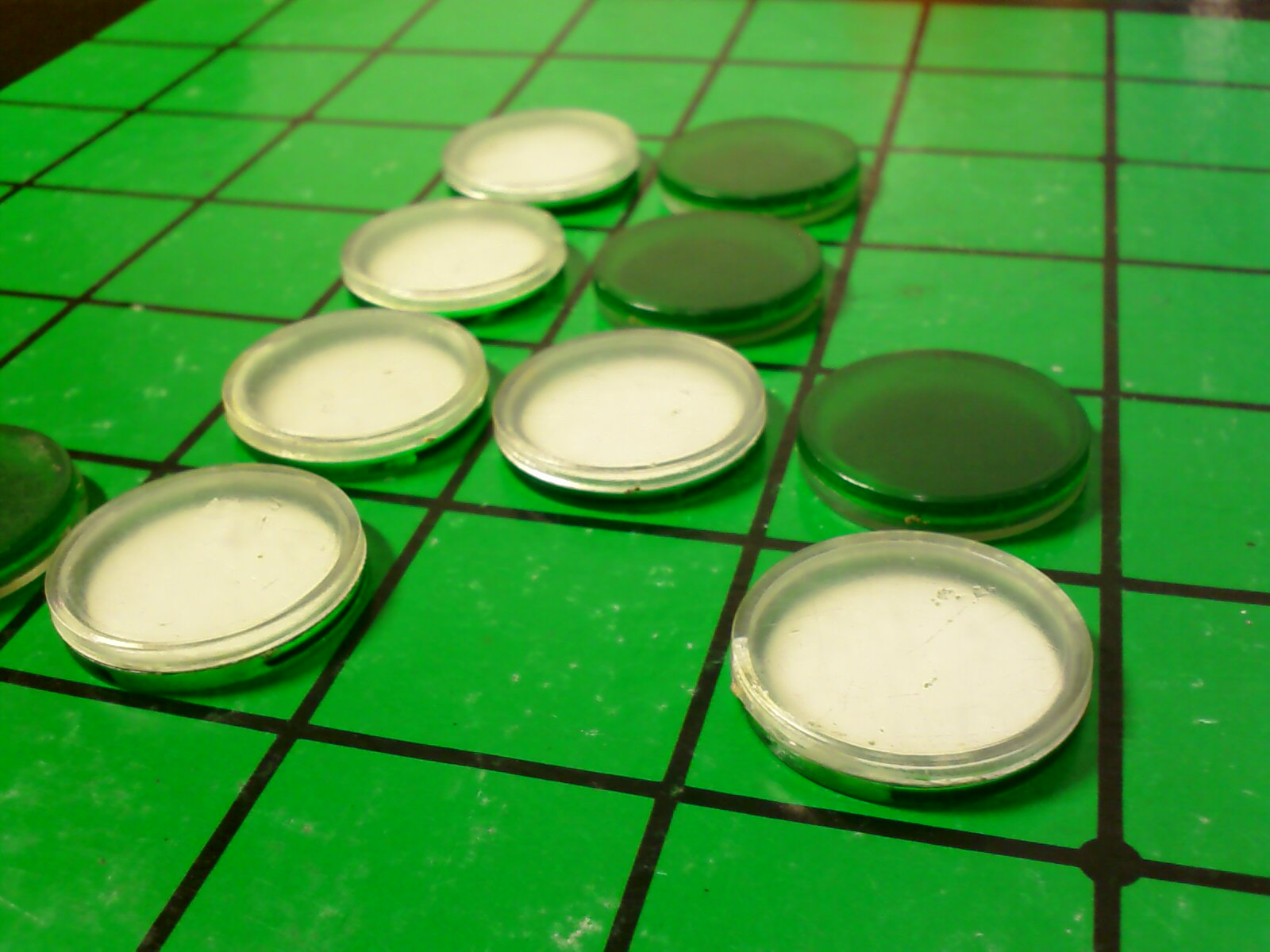
A modern plastic Othello set

The modern version of the game—the most regularly used rule-set, and the one used in international tournaments—is marketed and recognized as Othello (オセロ, osero). It was patented in Japan in 1971 by Goro Hasegawa (legal name: Satoshi Hasegawa), then a 38-year-old salesman. Hasegawa initially explained that Othello was an improvement on reversi, but from around 2000, he began to claim that he invented it in Mito regardless of reversi. Hasegawa also claimed that the origin of reversi/Othello dates back 5,000 years.

Hasegawa established the Japan Othello Association in March 1973, and held the first national Othello championship on 4 April 1973 in Japan. The Japanese game company Tsukuda Original launched Othello in late April 1973 in Japan under Hasegawa's license, which led to an immediate commercial success.

The name was selected by Hasegawa as a reference to the Shakespearean play Othello, the Moor of Venice, referring to the conflict between the Moor Othello and Iago, and to the unfolding drama between Othello, who is black, and Desdemona, who is white. The green color of the board is inspired by the image of the general Othello valiantly leading his battle in a green field. It can also be likened to a jealousy competition (jealousy being the central theme in Shakespeare's play, which popularized the term "green-eyed monster"), since players engulf the pieces of the opponent, thereby turning them to their possession.

Othello was first launched in the U.S. in 1975 by Gabriel Industries and it also enjoyed commercial success there. Sales have reportedly exceeded $600 million. More than 40 million classic games have been sold in over 100 countries.

Hasegawa's How to play Othello (Osero No Uchikata) in Japan in 1974, was published in 1977 in an English translation entitled How to Win at Othello.

Kabushiki Kaisha Othello, which was owned by Hasegawa, registered the trademark "OTHELLO" for board games in Japan; Tsukuda Original registered the trademark in the rest of the world. All intellectual property regarding Othello outside Japan is now owned by MegaHouse, the Japanese toy company that acquired Tsukuda Original's successor PalBox.

== Rules ==
Each of the disks' two sides corresponds to one player; they are referred to here as light and dark after the sides of Othello pieces, but any counters with distinctive faces are suitable. The game may for example be played with a chessboard and Scrabble pieces, with one player letters and the other backs.

The historical version of reversi starts with an empty board, and the first two moves made by each player are in the four central squares of the board. The players place their disks alternately with their colors facing up and no captures are made. A player may choose to not play both pieces on the same diagonal, different from the standard Othello opening. It is also possible to play variants of Reversi and Othello where the second player's second move may or must flip one of the opposite-colored disks (as variants closest to the normal games).

For the specific game of Othello, the game begins with four disks placed in a square in the middle of the grid, two facing light-side-up, two dark-side-up, so that the same-colored disks are on a diagonal. Convention has this such that the dark-side-up disks are to the north-east and south-west (from both players' perspectives), though this is only marginally consequential: where sequential openings' memorization is preferred, such players benefit from this. The dark player moves first.

	a	b	c	d	e	f	g	h
1	a1	b1	c1	d1	e1	f1	g1	h1	1
2	a2	b2	c2	d2	e2	f2	g2	h2	2
3	a3	b3	c3	d3	e3	f3	g3	h3	3
4	a4	b4	c4	d4O	e4X	f4	g4	h4	4
5	a5	b5	c5	d5X	e5O	f5	g5	h5	5
6	a6	b6	c6	d6	e6	f6	g6	h6	6
7	a7	b7	c7	d7	e7	f7	g7	h7	7
8	a8	b8	c8	d8	e8	f8	g8	h8	8
	a	b	c	d	e	f	g	h

Starting position

Dark must place a piece (dark-side-up) on the board and so that there exists at least one straight (horizontal, vertical, or diagonal) occupied line between the new piece and another dark piece, with one or more contiguous light pieces between them. For move one, dark has four options shown by translucently drawn pieces below:

	a	b	c	d	e	f	g	h
1	a1	b1	c1	d1	e1	f1	g1	h1	1
2	a2	b2	c2	d2	e2	f2	g2	h2	2
3	a3	b3	c3	d3x	e3	f3	g3	h3	3
4	a4	b4	c4x	d4O	e4X	f4	g4	h4	4
5	a5	b5	c5	d5X	e5O	f5x	g5	h5	5
6	a6	b6	c6	d6	e6x	f6	g6	h6	6
7	a7	b7	c7	d7	e7	f7	g7	h7	7
8	a8	b8	c8	d8	e8	f8	g8	h8	8
	a	b	c	d	e	f	g	h

Where dark may play

Play always alternates unless one player has no legal move, in which case they pass. After placing a dark disk, dark turns over (flips to dark, captures) the single disk (or chain of light disks) on the line between the new piece and an anchoring dark piece. Multiple chains of disks may be captured in a single move. No player can look back to the previous status of disks when playing moves. A valid move is one where at least one piece is reversed (flipped over).

If dark decided to put a piece in the topmost location (all choices are strategically equivalent at this time), one piece gets turned over, so that the board appears thus:

	a	b	c	d	e	f	g	h
1	a1	b1	c1	d1	e1	f1	g1	h1	1
2	a2	b2	c2	d2	e2	f2	g2	h2	2
3	a3	b3	c3	d3X	e3	f3	g3	h3	3
4	a4	b4	c4	d4X	e4X	f4	g4	h4	4
5	a5	b5	c5	d5X	e5O	f5	g5	h5	5
6	a6	b6	c6	d6	e6	f6	g6	h6	6
7	a7	b7	c7	d7	e7	f7	g7	h7	7
8	a8	b8	c8	d8	e8	f8	g8	h8	8
	a	b	c	d	e	f	g	h

After dark play

Now light plays. This player operates under the same rules, with the roles reversed: light lays down a light piece, causing a dark piece to flip. Possibilities at this time appear thus (indicated by transparent pieces):

	a	b	c	d	e	f	g	h
1	a1	b1	c1	d1	e1	f1	g1	h1	1
2	a2	b2	c2	d2	e2	f2	g2	h2	2
3	a3	b3	c3o	d3X	e3o	f3	g3	h3	3
4	a4	b4	c4	d4X	e4X	f4	g4	h4	4
5	a5	b5	c5o	d5X	e5O	f5	g5	h5	5
6	a6	b6	c6	d6	e6	f6	g6	h6	6
7	a7	b7	c7	d7	e7	f7	g7	h7	7
8	a8	b8	c8	d8	e8	f8	g8	h8	8
	a	b	c	d	e	f	g	h

Where light may play

Light takes the bottom left option and reverses one piece:

	a	b	c	d	e	f	g	h
1	a1	b1	c1	d1	e1	f1	g1	h1	1
2	a2	b2	c2	d2	e2	f2	g2	h2	2
3	a3	b3	c3	d3X	e3	f3	g3	h3	3
4	a4	b4	c4	d4X	e4X	f4	g4	h4	4
5	a5	b5	c5O	d5O	e5O	f5	g5	h5	5
6	a6	b6	c6	d6	e6	f6	g6	h6	6
7	a7	b7	c7	d7	e7	f7	g7	h7	7
8	a8	b8	c8	d8	e8	f8	g8	h8	8
	a	b	c	d	e	f	g	h

After light play

Players take alternate turns. If one player cannot make a valid move, play passes back to the other player. The game ends when the grid has filled up or if neither player can make a valid move.

Examples where the game ends before the grid is completely filled:

	a	b	c	d	e	f	g	h
1	a1O	b1O	c1O	d1O	e1O	f1O	g1O	h1O	1
2	a2O	b2O	c2O	d2O	e2O	f2O	g2O	h2O	2
3	a3O	b3O	c3O	d3O	e3O	f3O	g3O	h3O	3
4	a4O	b4O	c4O	d4O	e4O	f4O	g4O	h4	4
5	a5O	b5O	c5O	d5O	e5O	f5O	g5	h5	5
6	a6O	b6O	c6O	d6O	e6O	f6O	g6	h6X	6
7	a7O	b7O	c7O	d7O	e7O	f7O	g7O	h7	7
8	a8O	b8O	c8O	d8O	e8O	f8O	g8O	h8O	8
	a	b	c	d	e	f	g	h

Vlasáková 1 – 63 Schotte (European Grand Prix Prague 2011)

	a	b	c	d	e	f	g	h
1	a1	b1X	c1X	d1X	e1X	f1X	g1X	h1X	1
2	a2	b2O	c2O	d2O	e2O	f2O	g2	h2X	2
3	a3O	b3O	c3O	d3O	e3O	f3O	g3O	h3X	3
4	a4O	b4O	c4O	d4O	e4O	f4O	g4O	h4X	4
5	a5O	b5O	c5O	d5O	e5O	f5O	g5O	h5X	5
6	a6O	b6O	c6O	d6O	e6O	f6O	g6O	h6X	6
7	a7O	b7O	c7O	d7O	e7O	f7O	g7O	h7X	7
8	a8	b8O	c8O	d8O	e8O	f8O	g8	h8	8
	a	b	c	d	e	f	g	h

Vecchi 13 – 51 Nicolas (World Othello Championship 2017, Ghent)

	a	b	c	d	e	f	g	h
1	a1	b1	c1	d1	e1O	f1	g1	h1	1
2	a2	b2	c2	d2	e2O	f2O	g2	h2	2
3	a3O	b3O	c3O	d3O	e3O	f3O	g3O	h3X	3
4	a4	b4	c4O	d4O	e4O	f4O	g4	h4X	4
5	a5	b5	c5O	d5O	e5O	f5	g5	h5X	5
6	a6	b6	c6	d6	e6	f6	g6	h6	6
7	a7	b7	c7	d7	e7	f7	g7	h7	7
8	a8	b8	c8	d8	e8	f8	g8	h8	8
	a	b	c	d	e	f	g	h

Hassan 3 – 61 Verstuyft J. (European Grand Prix Ghent 2017)

The player with the most pieces on the board at the end of the game wins. The game is scored by counting the number of discs in each player's color. If the game ended before the grid was completely filled, any empty squares are scored for the winner. However, if one player defaults by running out of time, that player's opponent wins regardless of the board configuration. There are varying methods to determine the official score when a player defaults.

In common practice over the Internet, opponents agree upon a time-control of, typically, from one to thirty minutes per game per player. Standard time control in the World Championship is thirty minutes, and this or something close to it is common in over-the-board (as opposed to internet) tournament play generally. In time-defaulted games, where disk differential is used for tie-breaks in tournaments or for rating purposes, one common over-the-board procedure for the winner of defaulted contests to complete both sides' moves with the greater of the result thereby or one disk difference in the winner's favor being the recorded score. Games in which both players have the same number of disks their color at the end (almost always with a full-board 32–32 score) are not very common, but also not rare, and these are designated as "ties" and scored as half of a win for each player in tournaments. The term "draw" for such may also be heard, but is somewhat frowned upon.

What are generally referred to as transcript sheets are generally in use in tournament over-the-board play, with both players obligated to record their game's moves by placing the number of each move in an 8×8 grid. This both enables players to look up past games of note and tournament directors and players to resolve disputes (according to whatever specific rules are in place) where claims that an illegal move, flip or other anomaly are voiced. An alternative recording method not requiring a grid is also in use, where positions on a board are labeled left to right by letters a through h and top to bottom by digits 1 through 8. Note that the numbers run in the opposite direction to the chess standard, and that the perspective may be that of either player (with no fixed standard). This alternate notational scheme is used primarily in verbal discussions or where a linear representation is desirable in print, but may also be permissible as during-game transcription by either or both players.

Tournament over-the-board play has various ways of handling illegal moves and incorrect flips. For example, one procedure that has been used is to permit either player to make corrections going back some fixed number of moves.

=== Discussion ===
It can be easily proven that in a perfect information game like this one, with alternate moves and no chance events, one (and only one) of the three following cases is true:

1. Dark has a winning strategy
2. Light has a winning strategy
3. Each player can force at least a draw against any play by the opponent.

The proof, however, doesn't give the best strategy, nor does it say which of the three cases above is true. However, since in Othello (started with two pieces of each colour diagonally positioned in the centre of the board) all first moves of Dark are equivalent by symmetry, the best strategy, whatever it is, does not depend on Dark's first move.

=== Anti-Reversi ===
Anti-Reversi or Reversed Reversi is a variant of the game where the player wins who has fewer own-colored disks at the end of the game; draw is also a possible result. To put a disk on the board, the same rules apply as in normal reversi.

=== Brightwell Quotient ===
Invented by the British mathematician and three times runner-up at the World Championship and five times British Champion Graham Brightwell, this is the tie-breaker that is now used in many tournaments including the W.O.C. If two players have the same number of points in the thirteen-round W.O.C. Swiss, the tie is resolved in favour of the player with the higher Brightwell Quotient.

The Brightwell Quotient (BQ) is calculated as follows:

1. A constant c is calculated. It is the integer nearest to (number of squares on the board) divided by (number of rounds in the tournament).
2. If any of the player's opponents have withdrawn in the course of the tournament, or if a player has been paired against bye, ignore such games for the moment.
3. Calculate the total number of disks scored by the player in all games not covered by step 2 and add c times the sum of points scored by all of the player's opponents, except those who have withdrawn.
4. For each game against an opponent who has withdrawn, and each bye received, add half the number of squares on the board plus (c times the player's own tournament score) to the result calculated in step 3. The number resulting is the player's BQ.

== Computer opponents and research ==
Good Othello computer programs play very strongly against human opponents. This is mostly due to difficulties in human look-ahead peculiar to Othello: The interchangeability of the disks and therefore apparent strategic meaninglessness (as opposed to chess pieces for example) makes an evaluation of different moves much harder. This can be demonstrated with blindfold games, as the memorization of the board demands much more dedication from the players than in blindfold chess.

The first tournament pitting Othello computer programs against human opponents took place in 1980. In it, then world champion Hiroshi Inoue, although he would go on to win the tournament, lost a game against the computer program The Moor. In 1997, the computer Othello program Logistello defeated the reigning human champion, Takeshi Murakami, six games to zero.

Analysts have estimated the number of legal positions in Othello is at most 10^{28}, and it has a game-tree complexity of approximately 10^{58}. Mathematically, Othello is solved up to 8x8 board. On 4×4 and 6×6 boards under perfect play, the second player wins. On 8x8 board, the game results in draw under perfect play, according to an arXiv paper. The first of these proofs is relatively trivial, the second dates to around 1990, and the last one was done in 2023. When generalizing the game to play on an n×n board, the problem of determining if the first player has a winning move in a given position is PSPACE-complete.

== World Othello Championship ==
The World Othello Championship (WOC), which started in 1977, was first organized by the Japan Othello Association. From 1978 until 2004, the World Othello Championship was organized by the Othello TD group and Anjar Co. In 2005, the World Othello Federation took over the responsibility for the WOC.

From 1977 to 1986, each country could send one player to participate in the WOC. From 1987, each country could send up to three players to participate. In 1987, the title WOC team championship started. In 2005, a female championship category was added to the WOC. From 2006, each World Othello Federation member could send a full team of up to four players. In 2016, a youth champion title was added to the WOC. The WOC was cancelled in 2020 and 2021 due to the COVID-19 pandemic.

Year	Location	World Champion	Team	Runner-up	Female Champion	Youth Champion
1977	Tokyo	(Japan) Hiroshi Inoue	—N/a	(Norway) Thomas Heiberg	—N/a	—N/a
1978	New York City	(Japan) Hidenori Maruoka	—N/a	(United States) Carol Jacobs	—N/a	—N/a
1979	Rome	(Japan) Hiroshi Inoue	—N/a	(United States) Jonathan Cerf	—N/a	—N/a
1980	London	(United States) Jonathan Cerf	—N/a	(Japan) Takuya Mimura	—N/a	—N/a
1981	Brussels	(Japan) Hidenori Maruoka	—N/a	(United States) Brian Rose	—N/a	—N/a
1982	Stockholm	(Japan) Kunihiko Tanida	—N/a	(United States) David Shaman	—N/a	—N/a
1983	Paris	(Japan) Ken'Ichi Ishii	—N/a	(United Kingdom) Imre Leader	—N/a	—N/a
1984	Melbourne	(France) Paul Ralle	—N/a	(Japan) Ryoichi Taniguchi	—N/a	—N/a
1985	Athens	(Japan) Masaki Takizawa	—N/a	(Italy) Paolo Ghirardato	—N/a	—N/a
1986	Tokyo	(Japan) Hideshi Tamenori	—N/a	(France) Paul Ralle	—N/a	—N/a
1987	Milan	(Japan) Ken'Ichi Ishii	United States	(France) Paul Ralle	—N/a	—N/a
1988	Paris	(Japan) Hideshi Tamenori	United Kingdom	(United Kingdom) Graham Brightwell	—N/a	—N/a
1989	Warsaw	(Japan) Hideshi Tamenori	United Kingdom	(United Kingdom) Graham Brightwell	—N/a	—N/a
1990	Stockholm	(Japan) Hideshi Tamenori	France	(France) Didier Piau	—N/a	—N/a
1991	New York City	(Japan) Shigeru Kaneda	United States	(France) Paul Ralle	—N/a	—N/a
1992	Barcelona	(France) Marc Tastet	United Kingdom	(United Kingdom) David Shaman	—N/a	—N/a
1993	London	(United States) David Shaman	United States	(France) Emmanuel Caspard	—N/a	—N/a
1994	Paris	(Japan) Masaki Takizawa	France	(Denmark) Karsten Feldborg	—N/a	—N/a
1995	Melbourne	(Japan) Hideshi Tamenori	United States	(United States) David Shaman	—N/a	—N/a
1996	Tokyo	(Japan) Takeshi Murakami	United Kingdom	(France) Stéphane Nicolet	—N/a	—N/a
1997	Athens	(Japan) Makoto Suekuni	United Kingdom	(United Kingdom) Graham Brightwell	—N/a	—N/a
1998	Barcelona	(Japan) Takeshi Murakami	France	(France) Emmanuel Caspard	—N/a	—N/a
1999	Milan	(Netherlands) David Shaman	Japan	(Japan) Tetsuya Nakajima	—N/a	—N/a
2000	Copenhagen	(Japan) Takeshi Murakami	United States	(United States) Brian Rose	—N/a	—N/a
2001	New York City	(United States) Brian Rose	United States	(United States) Raphael Schreiber	—N/a	—N/a
2002	Amsterdam	(Netherlands) David Shaman	United States	(United States) Ben Seeley	—N/a	—N/a
2003	Stockholm	(United States) Ben Seeley	Japan	(Japan) Makoto Suekuni	—N/a	—N/a
2004	London	(United States) Ben Seeley	United States	(Japan) Makoto Suekuni	—N/a	—N/a
2005	Reykjavík	(Japan) Hideshi Tamenori	Japan	(South Korea) Kwangwook Lee	(Japan) Hisako Kinoshita	—N/a
2006	Mito	(Japan) Hideshi Tamenori	Japan	(Singapore) Makoto Suekuni	(Japan) Toshimi Tsuji	—N/a
2007	Athens	(Japan) Kenta Tominaga	Japan	(France) Stéphane Nicolet	(Japan) Yukiko Tatsumi	—N/a
2008	Oslo	(Italy) Michele Borassi	Japan	(Japan) Tamaki Miyaoka	(Germany) Liya Ye	—N/a
2009	Ghent	(Japan) Yusuke Takanashi	Japan	(Germany) Matthias Berg	(Japan) Mei Urashima	—N/a
2010	Rome	(Japan) Yusuke Takanashi	Japan	(Italy) Michele Borassi	(Netherlands) Jiska Helmes	—N/a
2011	Newark	(Japan) Hiroki Nobukawa	Japan	(Thailand) Piyanat Aunchulee	(United States) Jian Cai	—N/a
2012	Leeuwarden	(Japan) Yusuke Takanashi	Japan	(Japan) Kazuki Okamoto	(Sweden) Veronica Stenberg	—N/a
2013	Stockholm	(Japan) Kazuki Okamoto	Japan	(Thailand) Piyanat Aunchulee	(Finland) Katie Wu	—N/a
2014	Bangkok	(Japan) Makoto Suekuni	Japan	(United States) Ben Seeley	(Australia) Joanna William	—N/a
2015	Cambridge	(Japan) Yusuke Takanashi	Japan	(Japan) Makoto Suekuni	(United States) Yoko Sano Rose	—N/a
2016	Mito	(Thailand) Piyanat Aunchulee	Japan	(China) Yan Song	(China) Zhen Dong	(Japan) Masaki Wada
2017	Ghent	(Japan) Yusuke Takanashi	Japan	(Japan) Akihiro Takahashi	(Japan) Misa Sugawara	(Japan) Akihiro Takahashi
2018	Prague	(Japan) Keisuke Fukuchi	Japan	(Thailand) Piyanat Aunchulee	(Japan) Misa Sugawara	(Japan) Keisuke Fukuchi
2019	Tokyo	(Japan) Akihiro Takahashi	Japan	(Japan) Yusuke Takanashi	(Australia) Joanna William	(Japan) Akihiro Takahashi
2020	Cancelled					
2021	Cancelled					
2022	Paris	(Japan) Kento Urano	Japan	(Switzerland) Arthur Juigner	(Finland) Katie Pihlajapuro	(Japan) Fuyumi Okudaira
2023	Rome	(Japan) Yasushi Nagano	Japan	(Thailand) Rujipas Aunchulee	(Japan) Hisako Kinoshita	(Japan) Osuke Kawazoe
2024	Hangzhou	(Japan) Seiya Kurita	Japan	(Japan) Yusuke Takanashi	(Japan) Hisako Kinoshita	(Japan) Yo Tomita
2025	Ankara	(Japan) Seiya Kurita	Japan	(Japan) Yusuke Takanashi	(Japan) Miu Hisamatsu	(Singapore) Calvin Koh Ding Sheng

== Reception ==
Games magazine included Othello in their "Top 100 Games of 1980", noting that it was "Based on the Victorian game of reversi" and had achieved "remarkable success in this country for an abstract game of strategy".

Games magazine included Othello, Tournament Set in their "Top 100 Games of 1981", noting that by that time "Othello has become so popular that Gabriel now markets a computer version and a players' association publishes a quarterly magazine".

Games magazine included Othello in their "Top 100 Games of 1982", noting that "Although the goal is to finish with the most pieces of your color up, the best strategy, paradoxically, is usually to limit your opponent's options by flipping over as few of his discs as possible during the first two-thirds of the game."

== Reviews ==
- Games #1
- Jeux & Stratégie #6
- Family Games: The 100 Best

== See also ==
- Reversi Champion
