= Intuition =

Ability to acquire knowledge without conscious reasoning

Intuition is the ability to acquire knowledge without recourse to conscious reasoning or needing an explanation. Different fields use the word "intuition" in very different ways, including but not limited to: direct access to unconscious knowledge; unconscious cognition; gut feelings; inner sensing; inner insight to unconscious pattern-recognition; and the ability to understand something instinctively, without any need for conscious reasoning. Intuitive knowledge tends to be approximate or heuristic.

The word intuition comes from the Latin verb intueri translated as 'consider' or from the Late Middle English word intuit, 'to contemplate'. Use of intuition is sometimes referred to as responding to a "gut feeling" or "trusting your gut".

== Psychology ==
=== Freud ===
According to Sigmund Freud, knowledge could only be attained through the intellectual manipulation of carefully made observations. He rejected any other means of acquiring knowledge such as intuition. His findings could have been an analytic turn of his mind towards the subject.

=== Jung ===
In Carl Jung's theory of the ego, described in 1916 in Psychological Types, intuition is an "irrational function", opposed most directly by sensation, and opposed less strongly by the "rational functions" of thinking and feeling. Jung defined intuition as "perception via the unconscious": using sense-perception only as a starting point, to bring forth ideas, images, possibilities, or ways out of a blocked situation, by a process that is mostly unconscious.

Jung said that a person in whom intuition is dominant—an "intuitive type"—acts not on the basis of rational judgment but on sheer intensity of perception. An extroverted intuitive type, "the natural champion of all minorities with a future", orients to new and promising but unproven possibilities, often leaving to chase after a new possibility before old ventures have borne fruit, oblivious to his or her own welfare in the constant pursuit of change. An introverted intuitive type orients by images from the unconscious, ever exploring the psychic world of the archetypes, seeking to perceive the meaning of events, but often having no interest in playing a role in those events and not seeing any connection between the contents of the psychic world and him- or herself. Jung thought that extroverted intuitive types were likely entrepreneurs, speculators, cultural revolutionaries, often undone by a desire to escape every situation before it becomes settled and constraining—even repeatedly leaving lovers for the sake of new romantic possibilities. His introverted intuitive types were likely mystics, prophets, or cranks, struggling with a tension between protecting their visions from influence by others and making their ideas comprehensible and reasonably persuasive to others—a necessity for those visions to bear real fruit. Jung's discerning between intuitive types and sensing types was later used in the MBTI (Myers-Briggs Type Indicator), used as polar opposites on the mind.

=== Modern psychology ===
In modern psychology, intuition can encompass the ability to know valid solutions to problems and the making of decisions. For example, the recognition-primed decision (RPD) model explains how people can make relatively fast decisions without having to compare options. Gary Klein found that under time pressure, high stakes, and changing parameters, experts used their base of experience to identify similar situations and intuitively choose feasible solutions. The RPD model is a blend of intuition and analysis. The intuition is the pattern-matching process that quickly suggests feasible courses of action. The analysis is the mental simulation, a conscious and deliberate review of the courses of action.

Instinct is often misinterpreted as intuition. Its reliability is dependent on past knowledge and occurrences in a specific area. For example, someone who has had more experience with children will tend to have better instincts about what they should do in certain situations with them. This is not to say that one with a great amount of experience is always going to have an accurate intuition.

Intuitive abilities were quantitatively tested at Yale University in the 1970s. While studying nonverbal communication, researchers noted that some subjects were able to read nonverbal facial cues before reinforcement occurred. In employing a similar design, they noted that highly intuitive subjects made decisions quickly but could not identify their rationale. Their level of accuracy, however, did not differ from that of non-intuitive subjects.

According to the works of Daniel Kahneman, intuition is the ability to automatically generate solutions without long logical arguments or evidence. He mentions two different systems that we use when making decisions and judgements: the first is in charge of automatic or unconscious thoughts, the second in charge of more intentional thoughts. The first system is an example of intuition, and Kahneman believes people overestimate this system, using it as a source of confidence for knowledge they may not truly possess. These systems are connected with two versions of ourselves he calls the remembering self and experiencing self, relating to the creation of memories in "System 1". Its automatic nature occasionally leads people to experience cognitive illusions, assumptions that our intuition gives us and are usually trusted without a second thought.

Gerd Gigerenzer described intuition as processes and thoughts that are devoid of typical logic. He described two primary characteristics to intuition: basic rules of thumb (that are heuristic in nature) and "evolved capacities of the brain". The two work in tandem to give people thoughts and abilities that they do not actively think about as they are performed, and of which they cannot explain their formation or effectiveness. He does not believe that intuitions actively correlate to knowledge; he believes that having too much information makes individuals overthink, and that some intuitions will actively defy known information.

Intuition is also seen as a figurative launch pad for logical thinking. Intuition's automatic nature tends to precede more thoughtful logic. Even when based on moral or subjective standpoints, intuition provides a base—one that people will usually start to back up with logical thinking as a defense or justification rather than starting with a less biased viewpoint. The confidence in whether it is an intuition or not comes from how quickly they happen, because they are instantaneous feelings or judgments that we have surprising confidence in.

== Philosophy ==
Both Eastern and Western philosophers have studied intuition. The discipline of epistemology deals with the concept.

=== Eastern philosophy ===
In the East intuition is mostly intertwined with religion and spirituality, and various meanings exist in different religious texts.

==== Hinduism ====
In Hinduism, various attempts have been made to interpret how the Vedic and other esoteric texts regard intuition.

For Sri Aurobindo, intuition comes under the realm of knowledge by identity. He describes the human psychological plane (often referred to as mana in Sanskrit) as having two natures: The first being its role in interpreting the external world (parsing sensory information), and the second being its role in generating consciousness. He terms this second nature "knowledge by identity". Aurobindo finds that, as the result of evolution, the mind has accustomed itself to using certain physiological functions as its means of entering into relations with the material world; when people seek to know about the external world, they default to arriving at truths via their senses. Knowledge by identity, which currently only explains self-awareness, may extend beyond the mind and explain intuitive knowledge.

He says this intuitive knowledge was common to older humans (Vedic) and later was superseded by reason which currently organises our perception, thoughts, and actions and which resulted in a transition from Vedic thought to metaphysical philosophy and later to experimental science. He finds that this process, which seems to be decent, is actually a circle of progress, as a lower faculty is being pushed to take up as much from a higher way of working. He says that when self-awareness in the mind is applied to one's self and to the outer (other) self, this results in luminous self-manifesting identity; and the reason also converts itself into the form of the self-luminous intuitional knowledge.

Osho believed human consciousness is in a hierarchy from basic animal instincts to intelligence and intuition, and humans being constantly living in that conscious state often moving between these states depending on their affinity. He suggests that living in the state of intuition is one of the ultimate aims of humanity.

Advaita vedanta (a school of thought) takes intuition to be an experience through which one can come in contact with and experience Brahman.

==== Buddhism ====
Buddhism finds intuition to be a faculty in the mind of immediate knowledge. Buddhism puts the term intuition beyond the mental process of conscious thinking, as conscious thought cannot necessarily access subconscious information, or render such information into a communicable form. In Zen Buddhism various techniques have been developed to help develop one's intuitive capability, such as koans – the resolving of which leads to states of minor enlightenment (satori). In parts of Zen Buddhism intuition is deemed a mental state between the Universal mind and one's individual, discriminating mind.

=== Western philosophy ===
In the West, intuition does not appear as a separate field of study, but the topic features prominently in the works of many philosophers.

==== Ancient philosophy ====
Early mentions and definitions of intuition can be traced back to Plato. In his Republic he tries to define intuition as a fundamental capacity of human reason to comprehend the true nature of reality. In his works Meno and Phaedo, he describes intuition as a pre-existing knowledge residing in the "soul of eternity", and as a phenomenon by which one becomes conscious of pre-existing knowledge. He provides an example of mathematical truths, and posits that they are not arrived at by reason. He argues that these truths are accessed using a knowledge already present in a dormant form and accessible to our intuitive capacity. This concept by Plato is also sometimes referred to as anamnesis. The study was later continued by his intellectual successors, the Neoplatonists.

==== Islam ====
In Islam various scholars have varied interpretations of intuition (often termed as hadas, Arabic: حدس, "hitting correctly on a mark"), sometimes relating the ability to have intuitive knowledge to prophethood. Siháb al Din-al Suhrawardi, in his book Philosophy Of Illumination (ishraq), from following influences of Plato, finds that intuition is knowledge acquired through illumination and is mystical in nature; he also suggests mystical contemplation (mushahada) to bring about correct judgment. Also influenced by Platonic ideas, Ibn Sīnā (Avicenna) finds the ability to have intuition is a "prophetic capacity" and he describes intuition as knowledge obtained without intentionally acquiring it. He finds that regular knowledge is based on imitation while intuitive knowledge is based on intellectual certitude.

==== Early modern philosophy ====
In his book Meditations on First Philosophy, Descartes refers to an "intuition" (from the Latin verb intueor, which means "to see") as a pre-existing knowledge gained through rational reasoning or discovering truth through contemplation. This definition states that "whatever I clearly and distinctly perceive to be true is true"; this is commonly referred to as rational intuition It is a component of a potential logical mistake called the Cartesian circle. Intuition and deduction, says Descartes, are the unique possible sources of knowledge of the human intellect; the latter is a "connected sequence of intuitions", each of which is a priori a self-evident, clear and distinct idea, before it is connected with the other ideas within a logical demonstration.

Hume has a more ambiguous interpretation of intuition. Hume claims intuition is a recognition of relationships (relation of time, place, and causation). He states that "the resemblance" (recognition of relations) "will strike the eye" (which would not require further examination) but goes on to state, "or rather in mind"—attributing intuition to power of mind, contradicting the theory of empiricism.

==== Immanuel Kant ====
Immanuel Kant’s notion of "intuition" differs considerably from the Cartesian notion. It consists of the basic sensory information provided by the cognitive faculty of sensibility (equivalent to what might loosely be called perception). Kant held that our mind casts all of our external intuitions in the form of space, and all of our internal intuitions (memory, thought) in the form of time.

==== Contemporary philosophy ====
Intuitions are customarily appealed to as evidence, independently of any particular theory about how they provide that evidence. There are divergent accounts of what sort of mental state intuitions are, ranging from mere spontaneous judgment to a special presentation of a necessary truth. Philosophers such as George Bealer have tried to defend appeals to intuition against Quinean doubts about conceptual analysis.

A different challenge to appeals to intuition comes from experimental philosophers, who argue that appeals to intuition must be informed by the methods of social science.

The metaphilosophical assumption that philosophy ought to depend on intuitions has been challenged by experimental philosophers (e.g., Stephen Stich). One of the main problems adduced by experimental philosophers is that intuitions differ, for instance, from one culture to another, and so it seems problematic to cite them as evidence for a philosophical claim. Timothy Williamson responded to such objections against philosophical methodology by arguing that intuition plays no special role in philosophy practice, and that skepticism about intuition cannot be meaningfully separated from a general skepticism about judgment. On this view, there are no qualitative differences between the methods of philosophy and common sense, the sciences, or mathematics. Others like Ernest Sosa seek to support intuition by arguing that the objections against intuition merely highlight a verbal disagreement.

===== Philosophy of mathematics and logic =====
Intuitionism is a position advanced by L. E. J. Brouwer in philosophy of mathematics derived from Kant's claim that all mathematical knowledge is knowledge of the pure forms of the intuition—that is, intuition that is not empirical.

Intuitionistic logic was devised by Arend Heyting to accommodate this position (it has also been adopted by other forms of constructivism). It is characterized by rejecting the law of excluded middle: as a consequence it does not in general accept rules such as double negation elimination and the use of reductio ad absurdum to prove the existence of something.

== Business decision-making ==
In a 2022 Harvard Business Review article, Melody Wilding explored "how to stop overthinking and start trusting your gut", noting that "intuition... is frequently dismissed as mystical or unreliable". She suggested that there is a scientific basis for using intuition and refers to "surveys of top executives [which] show that a majority of leaders leverage feelings and experience when handling crises". However, an earlier Harvard Business Review article ("Don't Trust Your Gut") advises that, although "trust in intuition is understandable... anyone who thinks that intuition is a substitute for reason is indulging in a risky delusion".

== Intuition in organizations ==
Intuition has been assessed by a sample of 11 Australian organizational leaders as a gut feeling enhanced by experience—intuition is considered by them important when judgments are made by them about people, culture, and strategy. Such an example likens intuition to "gut feelings", which—when viable—illustrate preconscious activity.

== Honours ==
Intuition Peak in Antarctica is so named "in appreciation of the role of scientific intuition for the advancement of human knowledge".

== See also ==
- Anschauung
- Artistic inspiration
- Brainstorming
- Clairvoyance
- Déjà vu
- Dual process theory
- Extrasensory perception
- Focusing (psychotherapy)
- Foresight (psychology)
- Inner Relationship Focusing
- Intuition and decision-making
- Intuition pump
- Intelligence analysis#Trained intuition
- List of thought processes
- Luck
- Medical intuitive
- Morphic resonance
- Nous
- Phenomenology (philosophy)
- Precognition
- Serendipity
- Social intuitionism
- Synchronicity
- Tacit knowledge
- Truthiness
- Unconscious mind
