= Decision-making models =

Decision-making as a term is a scientific process when that decision will affect a policy affecting an entity. Decision-making models are used as a method and process to fulfill the following objectives:

- Every team member is clear about how a decision will be made
- The roles and responsibilities for the decision making
- Who will own the process to make the final decision

These models help the team to plan the process and the agenda for each decision-making meeting, and the understanding of the process and collaborative approach helps in achieving the support of the team members for the final decision to ensure commitment for the same.

== Types ==
There are several models of decision-making:

=== Economic rationality model ===
When using this model, the following conditions are assumed.

1. The decision will be completely rational in a means-ends sense
2. There is a complete and consistent system of preferences that allows a choice among alternatives
3. There is a complete awareness of all the possible alternatives
4. Probability calculations are neither frightening nor mysterious
5. There are no limits to the complexity of computations that can be performed to determine the best alternatives

According to Kuwashima (2014, p. 1) in an organizational decision-making context, the decision-maker approaches the problem in a solely objective way and avoids all subjectivity. Moreover, the rational choice theory revolves around the idea that every individual attempt to maximize their own personal happiness or satisfaction gained from a good or service. This basic idea leads to the “rational” decision model, which is often used in the decision-making process.

=== Simon's bounded rationality model ===
To present a more realistic alternative to the economic rationality model, Herbert Simon proposed an alternative model. He felt that management decision-making behavior could be described as follows:

1. In choosing between alternatives, the manager attempts to satisfy or looks for the one which is satisfactory or “good enough”. Examples of satisfying criteria would be adequate profit or share or the market and fair price.
2. They recognize that the world they perceive is a drastically simplified model of the real world. They are content with the simplification because they believe the real world is mostly empty anyway.
3. Because they satisfy rather than maximize, they can make their choices without first determining all possible behavior alternatives and without ascertaining that these are all the alternatives.
4. The managers treat the world as empty, they are able to make decisions with simple rules of thumb. These techniques do not make impossible demands upon their capacity for thought.

=== Neuroscientific (neurocognitive) model ===
In cognitive neuroscience, decision-making refers to the cognitive process of evaluating a number of possibilities and selecting the most appropriate thereof in order to further a specific goal or task. This faculty is a fundamental component of executive functions, although recent studies show that a complex brain network is involved including motor areas.

=== Incrementalism ===
The incrementalism model, also known as disjointed incrementalism, focuses on the limited cognitive capacities of the decision-makers. In the incremental model, the decision-maker only concentrates on those policies which distinguish incrementally from existing policies. This leads to a small number of policy alternatives, which are getting evaluated by a restricted number of criteria. Accordingly, the process is more manageable for the decision-maker.

== See also ==
- Cross-cultural differences in decision making
- Decision model
- Decision-making software
- Emotional choice theory
- Rational choice theory
- Decision-making under deep uncertainty
