= Predisposition =

Predisposition may refer to:

- Genetic predisposition, a genetic effect which can identify individuals who may be predisposed to certain health problems
- Predispositioning theory, mathematical term in the field of decision theory
- Calculus of predispositions, method of calculating probability
- Instinct, a biological predisposition, an innate and biologically vectored behavior that can be easily learned
- Predisposition (law), a legal concept related to entrapment
- Predisposition (psychology), related to the term genetic predisposition
