= Sven Bienert =

German researcher

Sven Bienert (born July 4, 1973) is a German economist and university lecturer. He is a professor at the International Real Estate Business School at the University of Regensburg. He is also a chartered surveyor.

== Early Life, Education and Career ==
Bienert completed his vocational education as a bank clerk at Oldenburgische Landesbank in 1995, and went on to graduate from the Administration and Business Academy and the German Real Estate Academy at the Albert-Ludwigs University in Freiburg in 1998 with a degree in property management (VWA). In 2001, he completed his degree with distinction in business administration at the Leuphana University of Lüneburg. During his studies, Bienert completed internships at Engel & Völkers and Arthur Andersen Real Estate.

Born in Hagen, Bienert was employed with KPMG Consulting in the real estate division from January 2002 to January 2003. From February 2003 to 2007, he headed the real estate economics department at the University of Applied Sciences in Kufstein, Austria. During this time he completed his PhD with summa cum laude in 2004, focusing on the effects of the new capital adequacy guidelines for banks (Basel II) on project financing in the property industry with ?

Since April 2010, he has been the Head of the IRE|BS Competence Center of Sustainable Real Estate at the International Real Estate Business School, University of Regensburg of which he was managing director from 2013 to 2019. His research focuses on sustainability strategies, valuation methodologies, and the integration of ESG principles into real estate markets.

From April 2007 to January 2011, Bienert headed the real estate division at KPMG Financial Advisory Services throughout Austria. Between 2011 and 2013, he was managing director of Probus Real Estate GmbH in Vienna, overseeing a real estate portfolio worth approximately €2.1 billion.

He is actively involved in various industry organizations, including the German Sustainable Building Council, the German Property Federation (ZIA) and Urban Land Institute (ULI). He is also a member of the European Valuation Standards Board of TEGoVA and the Expert Advisory Group of the Science Based Targets initiative (SBTi) since 2022. He was also elected to the DVFA Executive Board in 2023, where he is responsible for the real estate division.

He fulfils the role of reviewer and co-editor for a number of scientific journals in the property sector, including the Journal of Property Investment & Finance, the Journal of Sustainable Real Estate and the Journal of European Real Estate Research. Alongside his professorship at the University of Regensburg, he runs his own research institute and appraisal office in Wörgl, Austria. He has extensive experience as a generally sworn and court-certified expert and is constantly active as a consultant and lecturer.

From 2015 to the end of 2024, Bienert led the Carbon Risk Real Estate Monitor (CRREM) research project funded by the European Commission under its Horizon 2020 funding programme, which derived scientifically sound decarbonisation pathways for the real estate sector in order to define a standard for measuring greenhouse gas emissions in the building sector and assessing the sustainability of real estate. In this way, the sustainable performance of property (portfolios) can be harmonised with the goals of the Paris Climate Agreement and the avoidance of future regulatory or transitional risks can be supported. In this context, the now common term stranded asset refers to properties that are no longer in line with the goals of the Paris Climate Agreement. This standard has now been accepted by various market participants and is used globally. Bienert is also leading a sub-project of the Transara Sacred Space Transformation project funded by the German Research Foundation (DFG).

As a scientist, he has been quoted on the impact of natural hazards and extreme weather on property and warns of the economic consequences of climate change and global warming.

On 1 January 2026, Bienert was appointed to the supervisory board of Quadoro Investment GmbH and Dömges Architekten AG.

== Awards and honors ==
- 2005 2nd prize in the Real Estate Research Prize of the German Society for Property Research (gif) for his dissertation.
- 2007 Gerald Brown Memorial Prize in the category Best Paper Presented on Real Estate Investment
- 2011 Best Paper Award in the Appraisal Studies category at the European Real Estate Society (ERES) Conference 2011....
- 2013 Immobilien-Manager Award 2013 as a member of the project group for the development of the ZIA Green Lease Guide
- 2013 Recognised for his teaching as a 'Global Showcase' by the Royal Institution of Chartered Surveyors (RICS), in accordance with the UN Principles for Responsible Management Education (PRME).
- 2013 Real Estate Research Award from the Gesellschaft für Immobilienwirtschaftliche Forschung (gif) together with Hirsch, for the ImmoRisk research project on the quantification of climate risks in the property sector
- 2020 Outstanding Paper Award for the publication US Real Estate as target asset for European investors: New empirical evidence of diversification benefits in the Journal of Property Investment & Finance
- 2022 Richard Ratcliff Award for his academic work, presented at the ARES conference.
- 2022 ARES Manuscript Award for Housing, together with other authors

== Selected publications ==
- Benedikt Gloria, Johannes Melsbach, Sven Bienert und Detlef Schoder: Real-GPT: Efficiently Tailoring LLMs for Informed Decision-Making in the Real Estate Industry, in: Journal of Property Investment & Finance, February 2024
- Ben Hoehn, Hannah Salzberger, Sven Bienert: Assessing climate risk quantification tools - mere fulfillment of duty ot actually beneficial?, in: Journal of Property Investment & Finance, May 2024
- Benedikt Gloria, Sebastian Leutner, Sven Bienert: Unveiling the impact of SFDR on unlisted real estate funds: a J-Curve and panel regression analysis, in: Journal of Property Investment & Finance, April 2024
- Chiara Künzle, Julia Wein, Sven Bienert: The underestimated global warming potential of refrigerant losses in retail real estate: the impact of CO2 vs CO2e, in: Journal of European Real Estate Research, October 2023.
- Sven Bienert, Hunter Kuhlwein, Yannick Schmidt, Benedikt Gloria, Berivan Agbayir: Embodied Carbon of Retrofits. Ensuring the Ecological Payback of Energetic Retrofits(PDF; 3,3 MB), ISSN 2663–7634, Wörgl, Österreich, September 2023.
- Erik Landry, Sven Bienert, Madeline Schneider, Caspar Noach, Girl Linthorst: Accounting and Reporting of GHG Emissions from Real Estate Operations - Technical Guidance for the Financial Industry(PDF; 1,6 MB), March 2023
- Sven Bienert, Stanley McGreal, Paloma Taltavull, "Guest Editorial", in: Journal of European Real Estate Research, Vol. 13 No. 3, Dezember 2022.
- Alexander Groh, Hunter Kuhlwein, Sven Bienert: Does Retrofitting Pay Off? An Analysis of German Multifamily Building Data, in: Journal of Sustainable Real Estate (JOSRE), November 2022.
- Julia Wein, Sven Bienert, Hunter Kuhlwein: How to manage your net zero targets with CRREM - Guidelines(PDF; 7,1 MB), Wörgl, Österreich, June 2022.
- Julia Wein, Sven Bienert, Maximilian Spanner, Hunter Kuhlwein, Vanessa Huber: CRREM Survey on Transition Risk in Real Estate(PDF; 1,3 MB), Wörgl, Österreich, April 2022.
- Sven Bienert, Julia Wein, Maximilian Spanner, Hunter Kuhlwein, Vanessa Huber, Chiara Künzle, Matthew Ulterino, David Carlin und Maheen Arshad: Managing Transition Risk in Real Estate: Aligning to the Paris Climate Accord, Studie für die United Nations, March 2022.
- Cay Oertel, Ekaterina Kovaleva, Werner Gleißner, Sven Bienert: Stochastic framework for carbon price risk estimation of real estate: a Markov switching GARCH simulation approach, in: Journal of Property Investment & Finance, February 2022.
- Sven Bienert, Alexander Groh: Klimaneutralität vermieteter Mehrfamilienhäuser – Aber wie?(PDF; 3,7 MB), Study for GdW and VDPM e.V., 2022.
- Erik Landry, Julia Wein, Sven Bienert, Maximilian Spanner, Juan José Lafuente, Martin Haran, Peadar Davis, Michael McCord, Daniel Lo, Paloma Taltavull, Raul Perez, Francisco Juárez, Ana María Martinez, Dirk Brounen: CRREM Lessons learned report on best-practise users(PDF; 2,9 MB), Wörgl, Österreich, April 2021.
- Sven Bienert, Peter Geiger, Maximilian Spanner: Naturgefahren und Immobilienwerte in Deutschland(PDF; 4,1 MB), IRE|BS Contributions to the property industry, issue 25, ISSN 2197-7720, Regensburg, 2020.
- Cay Oertel, Thomas Gütle, Benjamin Klisa, Sven Bienert: US real estate as target assets for European investors: New empirical evidence of diversification benefits, in: Journal of Property Investment & Finance, May 2019.
- Sven Bienert, Jens Hirsch, Maximilian Spanner: The Carbon Risk Real Estate Monitor - Developing a Framework for Science-based Decarbonizing and Reducing Stranding Risks within the Commercial Real Estate Sector (PDF; 1,1 MB), in: Journal of Sustainable Real Estate, January 2019.
- Marcelo Cajias, Franz Fürst, Sven Bienert: Tearing down the information barrier: the price impacts of energy efficiency ratings for buildings in the German rental market, in: Journal of Energy Research & Social Science, January 2019.
- Jonas Hahn, Jens Hirsch, Sven Bienert: Does "clean" pay off? Housing markets and their perception of heating technology, in: Property Management, August 2018.
- Sven Bienert, Klaus Wagner: Bewertung von Spezialimmobilien, 2nd issue, ISBN 978-3-8349-4737-6, Wiesbaden, 2018.
- Sven Bienert, Marcelo Cajias, Jens Hirsch: Bewertung des kirchlichen Immobilienbestandes, ISBN 978-3-8487-3352-1, Baden-Baden, 2016.
- Sven Bienert, Peter Geiger: Bewertung des Immobilienbestandes, in: Immobilienmanagement für Sozialwirtschaft und Kirche – Handbuch für Praktiker, ISBN 978-3-8487-2214-3, 2016.
- Sven Bienert: Climate Change Implications for Real Estate Portfolio Allocation – Business as usual or game shift?, in: Urban Land Institute, 2016.
- Jonas Hahn, Verena Keil, Thomas Wiegelmann, Sven Bienert: Office Properties through the Interest Cycle – Performance Impact and Economic Sustainability in Germany, in: Journal of Property Investment & Finance, August 2016.
- Markus Surmann, Wolfgang Brunauer, Sven Bienert: The energy efficiency of corporate real estate assets - The role of energy management for corporate, in: Journal of Corporate Real Estate, May 2016.
- Markus Surmann, Wolfgang Brunauer, Sven Bienert: Energy efficiency: behavioural effects of occupants and the role of refurbishment for European office buildings, in: Pacific Rim Property Research Journal (PRPRJ), May 2016.
- Thomas Braun, Sven Bienert: Is Green (still) a Matter of Prime - Stylized Facts about the Location of Commercial Green Buildings, in: Journal of Sustainable Real Estate, November 2015.
- Markus Surmann, Wolfgang Brunauer, Sven Bienert: How does energy efficiency influence the Market Value of office buildings in Germany and does this effect increase over time?, in: Journal of European Real Estate Research, November 2015.
- Jens Hirsch, Thomas Braun, Sven Bienert: Assessment of Climatic Risks for Real Estate, in: Property Management, October 2015.
- Nelufer Ansari, Marcelo Cajias, Sven Bienert: The Value contribution of Sustainability Reporting – empirical evidence for real estate companies, in: Journal of Finance and Risk Perspectives, October 2015.
- Sven Bienert, Wolfgang Schäfers, Werner Knips, Thomas Zinnöcker: Nachhaltige Unternehmensführung in der Immobilienwirtschaft, ZIA, Zentraler Immobilienausschuss (Hrsg.), ISBN 978-3-89984-339-2, Cologne, 2015.
- Marcelo Cajias, Franz Fürst, Sven Bienert: Can Investing in Corporate Social Responsibility Lower a Company's Cost of Capital?, in: Studies in Economics and Finance, October 2014.
- Sven Bienert, Margret Funk: Immobilienbewertung Österreich, 3. Auflage, ISBN 978-3-902266-25-5, Vienna, 2014.
- Peter Geiger, Marcelo Cajias, Sven Bienert: The Asset Allocation of Sustainable Real Estate: A Chance for a Green Contribution, in: Journal of Corporate Real Estate, Special Issue: Sustainable Real Estate, March 2013.
- Sven Bienert, Erika Meins: Real Estate, in: Mirjam Staub-Bisang (Hrsg.): Sustainable Investing for Institutional Investors - Risks, Regulation and Strategies, 2012, ISBN 978-1-118-20317-0
- Marcelo Cajias, Peter Geiger, Sven Bienert: Green Agenda and Green Performance: Empirical Evidence for Real Estate Companies, in: Journal of European Real Estate Research, August 2012.
- Daniela Popescu, Sven Bienert, Christian Schuetzenhofer, Rodica Boazu: Impact of Energy-Efficiency Measures on the Economic Value of Buildings, in: Journal of Applied Energy, January 2012.
- Sven Bienert und Thomas Braun: Nachhaltigkeit und Immobilienfonds – Ein Erfolgsrezept der Zukunft? in: Dr. Christoph Schumacher, Dr. Tobias Pfeffer, Hubertus Bäumer (Hrsg.): Praxishandbuch Immobilienfondsmanagement und -investment, Cologne 2011.
- Marcelo Cajias, Sven Bienert: Does Sustainability Pay Off for European Listed Real Estate Companies? The Dynamics between Risk and the Provision of Responsible Information Journal of Sustainable Real Estate, January 2011.
- Gerrit Leopoldsberger, Sven Bienert, Wolfgang Brunauer, Kerstin Bobsin, Christian Schützenhöfer: Energising Property Valuation – Putting a Value on Energy Efficient Buildings, in: The Appraisal Journal, issue 79, January 2011.
- Wolfgang Brunauer, S. Lang, P. Wechselberger, Sven Bienert: Additive Hedonic Regression Models with Spatial Scaling Factors: An Application for Rents in Vienna, in: Journal of Real Estate Finance and Economics, June 2010.
- Sven Bienert et al.: Improving the Market Impact of Energy Certification by Introducing Energy Efficiency and Lifecycle Costs into Property Valuation Practice, EU research project IEE-Intelligent Energy Europe, www.immovalue.org.
- Sven Bienert, Christian Schützenhöfer: Aspekte der Immobilienbewertung bei G-REITs, in: Stephan Bone-Winkel, Wolfgang Schäfer, Karl-Werner Schulte (Hrsg.): Handbuch Real Estate Investment Trusts, Cologne 2008.
- Sven Bienert, Wolfgang Brunauer: Mortgage Lending Value – Prospects for Development within Europe, ERES Best Paper Award, in: Journal of Property Investment & Finance, 2007.
- Sven Bienert: Bewertung von Spezialimmobilien, ISBN 3-409-12522-1, Wiesbaden 2005.
- Sven Bienert: Projektfinanzierung in der Immobilienwirtschaft – Dynamische Veränderungen der Rahmenbedingungen und Auswirkungen von Basel II, Dissertation, Wiesbaden 2005.
- Wiederkehrende Veröffentlichung des "Immobilienreport Regensburg" in cooperation with Sparkasse Regensburg.
