= Victor Polterovich =

Russian economist

Victor M. Polterovich
- Виктор Меерович Полтерович
- Born: 27 December 1937 (age 88); Moscow

Academic background
- Education: Moscow State University; Gubkin Russian State University of Oil and Gas
- Influences: Aron Katsenelinboigen

Victor Meerovich Polterovich (born 27 December 1937) is a Russian economist. He was one of the leading figures in mathematical economics in the Soviet Union and post-Soviet Russia, and made several important contributions to general equilibrium theory.

Born in Moscow, he obtained a diploma in engineering from Gubkin Russian State University of Oil and Gas in 1962, before taking post-graduate courses at Moscow State University. After an invitation by Aron Katsenelinboigen, Polterovich joined the Central Economic Mathematical Institute in 1966. While remaining a "simple" research fellow, his research contributions gained international recognition. He was a member of the editorial board of the Journal of Mathematical Economics (1985–2009), and an associate editor of Econometrica (1989–95).

== Selected publications ==
- ——— (1993). "Rationing, Queues, and Black Markets". Econometrica. 61 (1): 1–28. doi:10.2307/2951776. JSTOR 2951776.
- Henkin, Gennadi M.; ——— (1991). "Schumpeterian dynamics as a non-linear wave theory". Journal of Mathematical Economics. 20 (6): 551–590. doi:10.1016/0304-4068(91)90026-P.
- ———; Spivak, V. A. (1983). "Gross substitutability of point-to-set correspondences". Journal of Mathematical Economics. 11 (2): 117–140. doi:10.1016/0304-4068(83)90032-0.
