= Naturalistic decision-making =

Approach in decision theory

The naturalistic decision making (NDM) framework emerged as a means of studying how people make decisions and perform cognitively complex functions in demanding, real-world situations. These include situations marked by limited time, uncertainty, high stakes, team and organizational constraints, unstable conditions, and varying amounts of experience.

== The NDM framework and its origins ==
The NDM movement originated at a conference in Dayton, Ohio in 1989, which resulted in a book by Gary Klein, Judith Orasanu, Roberta Calderwood, and Caroline Zsambok. The NDM framework focuses on cognitive functions such as decision making, sensemaking, situational awareness, and planning – which emerge in natural settings and take forms that are not easily replicated in the laboratory. For example, it is difficult to replicate high stakes, or to achieve extremely high levels of expertise, or to realistically incorporate team and organizational constraints. Therefore, NDM researchers rely on cognitive field research methods such as task analysis to observe and study skilled performers. From the perspective of scientific methodology, NDM studies usually address the initial stages of observing phenomena and developing descriptive accounts. In contrast, controlled laboratory studies emphasize the testing of hypotheses. NDM and controlled experimentation are thus complementary approaches. NDM provides the observations and models, and controlled experimentation provides the testing and formalization.

== Recognition-primed decision-making model (RPD) ==
The present form of RPD has three main variations. In the first variation, the decision maker when faced with the problem at hand, responds with the course of action that was first generated. In the second variation, the decision maker tries to understand the course of events that led up to the current situation, using mental simulation. In the final variation, the decision maker evaluates each course of action generated and then chooses the most appropriate strategy. Expertise is crucial for using RPD, as it necessary to mentally simulate the course of events that might have led up to the observed situation and to evaluate the course of action generated.

== See also ==
- Intuition
- Macrocognition
- Recognition-primed decision
