= Calculus of predispositions =

Calculus of predispositions is a basic part of predispositioning theory and belongs to the indeterministic procedures.

== Overview ==
"The key component of any indeterministic procedure is the evaluation of a position. Since it is impossible to devise a deterministic chain linking the inter-mediate state with the outcome of the game, the most complex component of any indeterministic method is assessing these intermediate stages. It is precisely the function of predispositions to assess the impact of an intermediate state upon the future course of development."

According to Aron Katsenelinboigen, calculus of predispositions is another method of computing probability. Both methods may lead to the same results and, thus, can be interchangeable. However, it is not always possible to interchange them since computing via frequencies requires availability of statistics, possibility to gather the data as well as having the knowledge of the extent to which one can interlink the system’s constituent elements. Also, no statistics can be obtained on unique events and, naturally, in such cases the calculus of predispositions becomes the only option.

The procedure of calculating predispositions is linked to two steps – dissection of the system on its constituent elements and integration of the analyzed parts in a new whole. According to Katsenelinboigen, the system is structured by two basic types of parameters – material and positional. The material parameters constitute the skeleton of the system. Relationships between them form positional parameters. The calculus of predispositions primarily deals with

- analyzing the system’s material and positional parameters as independent variables and
- measuring them in unconditional valuations.

"In order to quantify the evaluation of a position we need new techniques, which I have grouped under the heading of calculus of predispositions. This calculus is based on a weight function, which represents a variation on the well-known criterion of optimality for local extremum.
This criterion incorporates material parameters and their conditional valuations.

The following key elements distinguish the modified weight function from the criterion of optimality:

- First and foremost, the weight function includes not only material parameters as independent (controlling) variables, but also positional (relational) parameters.
- The valuations of material and positional parameters comprising the weight function are, to a certain extent, unconditional; that is, they are independent of the specific conditions, but do take into account the rules of the game and statistics (experience)." (The Concept of Indeterminism 35)

== Relation to frequency probability ==
There are some differences between frequency-based and predispositions-based methods of computing probability.

- The frequency-based method is grounded in statistics and frequencies of events.
- The predispositions-based method approaches a system from the point of view of its predisposition. It is used when no statistics is available.
- The predispositions-based method is used for the novel and unique situations.

The procedure of calculating predispositions is linked to two steps – dissection of the system on its constituent elements and integration of the analyzed parts in a new whole.

According to Katsenelinboigen, the two methods of computing probability may complement each other if, for instance, they are applied to a multilevel system with an increasing complexity of its composition at higher levels.

== See also ==
- Predispositioning theory
- Karl Popper
