= Gary A. Klein =

American psychologist and author

Gary Klein
- Born: February 5, 1944 (age 82); New York City, New York, U.S. (United States)
- Education: B.A. in Psychology, Ph.D. in Experimental Psychology
- Occupation: Research Psychologist
- Spouse: Helen Klein (deceased)

Gary Klein (born February 5, 1944, in New York City, New York, U.S.) is a research psychologist famous for pioneering in the field of naturalistic decision making. By studying experts such as firefighters in their natural environment, he discovered that laboratory models could not adequately describe decision making under time pressure and uncertainty. His recognition-primed decision (RPD) model has influenced changes in the ways the Marines and Army train their officers to make decisions. The concept of expertise has been central to the models he has developed, the research he has conducted, and the training and design efforts he has accomplished.

Klein received his B.A. in psychology from City College of New York (1964) and his Ph.D. in Experimental Psychology from the University of Pittsburgh (1969). He listed his main influences as Hubert Dreyfus, Adriaan de Groot, and Karl Duncker in an October 2013 interview with Bob Morris.

Since 2009, Klein has been a Senior Scientist at MacroCognition LLC.

He spent the first phase of his career in academia as an assistant professor of psychology at Oakland University (1970–1974). He also spent a few years as associate professor of psychology at Wilberforce University in Ohio.

The second phase was spent working for the government as a research psychologist for the U.S. Air Force (1974–1978). The Arab oil embargo of 1973 meant that pilots needed to do more of their training in simulators, and Klein began his investigations into the way people develop expertise.

The third phase began in 1978 when he founded his own R&D company, Klein Associates, to study a range of topics later described as the Naturalistic Decision Making framework. Klein Associates grew to 37 people by the time he sold it to Applied Research Associates (ARA) in 2005.

During this third phase, Dr. Klein developed a Recognition-Primed Decision (RPD) model in 1985 to describe how people actually make decisions in natural settings. This research was subsequently incorporated in Army doctrine for command and control. He presented a PreMortem method of risk assessment in 1998. In 2007, he developed a naturalistic model of sensemaking, the Data/Frame model. In 2009, he presented a Management by Discovery account of how people plan when faced with ill-defined goals. He described a multi-path model of insight in 2011. He has led teams that developed several methods of cognitive task analysis for uncovering the tacit knowledge that goes into decision making and for studying cognition in complex settings, including the Critical Decision Method and the Knowledge Audit. He was one of the leaders of a team that redesigned the White House Situation Room. Dr. Klein and his colleagues have also developed the Artificial Intelligence Quotient (AIQ) toolkit, including the Cognitive Tutorial, to help people better manage specific AI systems they need to manage.

In 2015, Gary founded ShadowBox LLC, a cognitive skills training company. The ShadowBox Training Method originated from a Master's thesis in 2008, conducted by since-retired fire battalion chief, Neil Hintze. Gary and Neil worked together to refine this method for training cognitive skill development. The goal of the ShadowBox method is to provide a flexible, scenario-based training technique, that allows trainees to see the world through the eyes of experts — without the experts having to be present. Klein and others report that ShadowBox training has been employed in the military, law enforcement, healthcare, social services, and petrochemical domains.

He is a Fellow of both the American Psychological Association and the Human Factors and Ergonomics Society. In 2008, he received the Jack A. Kraft Innovator Award from the Human Factors and Ergonomics Society.

== Publications ==
- Books
  - Sources of Power: How People Make Decisions. Cambridge, MA: MIT Press 1999 ISBN 0-262-61146-5
  - The Power of Intuition: How to Use Your Gut Feelings to Make Better Decisions at Work. Currency, 2004 ISBN 0-385-50289-3
  - Streetlights and Shadows: Searching for the Keys to Adaptive Decision Making. Cambridge, MA: MIT Press 2009 ISBN 0-262-01339-8
  - Working Minds: A Practitioner's Guide to Cognitive Task Analysis. Cambridge, MA: A Bradford Book 2006 ISBN 978-0262532815
  - Seeing What Others Don't: The Remarkable Ways We Gain Insights. New York, NY: Public Affairs 2013 ISBN 978-1610392518
  - Snapshots of the Mind. Cambridge, MA: MIT Press 2022 ISBN 978-0262544429
  - Ed. (with Judith Orasanu, and Roberta Calderwood) Decision Making in Action: Models and Methods Ablex, 1993 ISBN 0-89391-943-8
  - Ed. (with Eduardo Salas) Linking Expertise and Naturalistic Decision Making Erlbaum, 2001 ISBN 0-8058-3538-5
  - Ed. (with Caroline Zsambok) Naturalistic Decision Making Erlbaum, 1996 ISBN 0-8058-1874-X
- Selected articles in refereed journals
  - with Roberta Calderwood and Beth W. Crandall Time Pressure, Skill, and Move Quality in Chess The American Journal of Psychology, Vol. 101, No. 4 (Winter, 1988), 481–493
  - with Calderwood, R. and MacGregor, D. Critical decision method for eliciting knowledge Systems, Man and Cybernetics, IEEE Transactions on May/Jun 1989 Vol. 19, 3, 462–472
  - with Karen J. Peio Use of a Prediction Paradigm to Evaluate Proficient Decision Making The American Journal of Psychology, Vol. 102, No. 3 (Autumn, 1989), pp. 321–331
  - Klein, G., & Jarosz, A. (2011). A naturalistic study of insight. Journal of Cognitive Engineering and Decision Making, 5, 335–351.
  - Klein, G. (2011). Critical thoughts about critical thinking. Theoretical Issues in Ergonomics Science, 12:3, 210–224.
  - Klein, G., Calderwood, R., & Clinton-Cirocco, A. (2010). Rapid decision making on the fire ground: The original study plus a postscript. Journal of **Cognitive Engineering and Decision Making, 4, 186–209.
  - Kahneman, D., & Klein, G. (2009). Conditions for intuitive expertise: A failure to disagree. American Psychologist, 64, 515–526.
  - Klein, G. (2008). Naturalistic decision making. Human Factors, 50 (3), 456–460.
  - Klein, G. (2007). Performing a project PreMortem. Harvard Business Review, September, 18–19.
  - Klein, G., Phillips, J. K., Rall, E., & Peluso, D. A. (2007). A data/frame theory of sensemaking, In R. R. Hoffman (Ed.) Expertise out of Context. Erlbaum: **Mahweh, NJ
  - Klein, G., Pliske, R. M., Crandall, B., & Woods, D. (2005). Problem detection. Cognition, Technology, and Work, 7, 14–28.
  - Klein, G., Ross, K. G., Moon, B. M., Klein, D. E., Hoffman, R. R., & Hollnagel, E. (2003). Macrocognition. IEEE Intelligent Systems, 18(3), 81–85.
  - Lipshitz, R., Klein, G., Orasanu, J., & Salas, E. (2001). Focus article: Taking stock of naturalistic decision making. Journal of Behavioral Decision Making, 14, 331–352.
  - Klein, G., & Weick, K. (June 2000). Making better decisions. Across the Board, 37(6), 16–22.
  - Klinger, D. W., & Klein, G. (1999). Emergency response organizations: An accident waiting to happen. Ergonomics in Design, 7(3), 20–25.
