= Decision-making under deep uncertainty =

Decision science practice and analytical framework

Decision making under deep uncertainty (DMDU) is a decision science practice and analytical framework that evaluates potential solutions across multiple plausible future scenarios rather than attempting to predict a single future outcome. This approach is particularly valuable for strategic planning, public policy, and risk management when stakeholders, analysts, and decision-makers cannot reach consensus about future conditions or when traditional forecasting methods are inadequate due to fundamental uncertainties.

DMDU employs simulation models and scenario planning to explore potential futures through multiple "States of the World" (SOWs) and alternative scenarios, enabling comparison of how different policy options or decisions might perform across diverse possible outcomes. The methodology focuses on identifying robust and adaptive decisions that can perform well across a range of uncertain conditions, rather than optimizing for a single predicted future.

The term "deep uncertainty" distinguishes this approach from traditional decision theory and risk analysis, which typically assume that probabilities can be assigned to different outcomes. In contrast, DMDU is applied when uncertainties are so profound that multiple parties cannot agree on the appropriate probability distributions, system models, or even the range of possible outcomes. This framework has been increasingly applied to long-term challenges such as climate change adaptation, infrastructure planning, water resources management, and urban planning, where decisions must remain effective despite significant uncertainties about future conditions.

== Levels of uncertainty ==
DMDU practitioners employ a variety of descriptions for levels of certainty. As Donald Rumsfeld remarked, there are known unknowns (what we know we do not know) and unknown unknowns (what we do not know that we do not know). The Clean Air Task Force describes these levels as:

Uncertainty that can be quantified or characterized by specific questions:

- Level 1: Virtual certainty
- Level 2: Alternate futures with probabilities
- Level 3: Alterative futures with ranked possibilities

Deep uncertainties:

- Level 4: Multiple plausible futures (where possible outcomes are known, but their likelihood cannot be predicted)
- Level 5: Unknown unknowns (where the full range of possible outcomes is unknown and the likelihood of any of these outcomes cannot be predicted).

== Applications ==
DMDU methods can help develop plans when there is a wide range of unknown futures. These methods are widely applicable to many sectors.

=== Climate scenario planning ===
The Intergovernmental Panel on Climate Change (IPCC) has used DMDU concepts to examine risks and scenarios in multiple future storylines since the early 2000s. The Science Advisory Board for the National Oceanic and Atmospheric Administration (NOAA) recommended that NOAA use DMDU techniques in its strategic planning: "The benefits of DMDU techniques include systematic and deliberative exploration of possible futures for management applications that could reduce the potential for unanticipated and unintended consequences. Because DMDU techniques seek to identify 'low-regret' and/or robust solutions that are beneficial over a broad set of potential future situations, they have the potential to improve confidence that proposed policy and program actions are worthwhile."

=== Transportation planning ===
The RAND Corporation partnered with the Federal Emergency Management Agency to develop a guide for using DMDU in transportation planning.

The U.S. Department of Transportation uses these analyses "when probabilistic forecasts are unavailable or when there is low confidence in or significant disagreement regarding any such estimates.

The Sacramento Area Council of Governments (SACOG) used DMDU in its 2016 Metropolitan Transportation Plan to stress test the plan against 10,000 modeled futures with different combination for gas prices, fuel efficiency, employment, zero emissions vehicles emissions, customer behavior, and vehicle miles traveled.

=== Water ===
Water conditions rely on temperature and precipitation patterns. DMDU provides a way to visualize how water operations could be optimized or could be used to avert water shortages and to handle droughts or floods.

RAND partnered with the Bureau of Reclamation to develop case studies, including the Colorado River and the Pecos River.

=== Energy ===
Energy decisions involve many uncertainties including future climates (decarbonization pathways), technological advances, economic development; many stakeholders. Decisions must be made quickly as well as decisions to invest in long-term infrastructures. Therefore, DMDU analyses have proven useful in the energy sector. The Clean Air Task Force characterised the high levels of uncertainty in the energy sector as "Critically, what makes decisions around the energy transition different from many other uncertain political contexts is that not only are we unsure about the future, but we do not have any information about the probabilities of possible outcomes. In fact, even the full range of possible outcomes is unknowable. This concept of making decisions with this degree of unknowns about the scope of future states is referred to as decision making under deep uncertainty (DMDU)."

=== Public health ===
DMDU can be used for pandemic planning as preparing only for worst-case scenarios may lead to overspending and distract attention from prevention, treatment, and innovation. DMDU can provide an overall framework for decision making and analysis in ongoing health crises.

== Initiatives and organizations ==
The Society for Decision Making Under Deep Uncertainty brings professionals together to improve DMDU tools and practices.

=== DMDU conferences and workshops ===
The Transportation Research Board hosted a DMDU Initiative meeting at its 2024 annual meeting to rename their planning initiative to DMDU.

DMDU Society meetings include:

- The 11th Annual Conference of the Society for Decision Making Under Deep Uncertainty (DMDU) took place November 19–21, 2024 and was hosted by University of Denver and the Bureau of Reclamation.
- 2020 online (Hosted by Tecnológico de Monterrey)
- 2019 in Delft
- 2018 in Southern California
- 2017 in Oxford
- 2016 in Washington, D.C.
- 2015 in Delft
- 2014 in Santa Monica
- 2013 in Washington, D.C.

== See also ==
- Info-gap decision theory
- Robust decision-making
- Decision-making models
