= Ethical decision-making =

In business ethics, Ethical decision-making is the study of the process of making decisions that engender trust, and thus indicate responsibility, fairness and caring to an individual. To be ethical, one has to demonstrate respect, and responsibility. Ethical decision-making requires a review of different options, eliminating those with an unethical standpoint, and then choosing the best ethical alternative.

== See also ==
- Ethical code
