= Let Simon Decide =

Online decision-making system

- Website type: Collaboration
- Available in: English and Spanish
- Owner: Steven DuBrow
- Website: LetSimonDecide.com
- Commercial: Yes
- Registration: Yes
- Launched: February 21, 2009
- Current status: Active

Let Simon Decide is an online decision-making system based on decision science that uses complex algorithms and a personality test to help people make decisions. It emerged about the same time that Hunch.com launched and the two websites were often compared together.

Let Simon Decide was launched on February 21, 2009 and founded by former Mattel director Ricardo Solar, designers, writers, MBAs, analysts and decision making experts. The company was originally located in Redondo Beach, California but currently is headquartered in Bradenton, Florida.

Let Simon Decide became available to the public on May 2, 2009 and was recently acquired by Strategic Connections Enterprises LLC in 2024. The new CEO is Steven DuBrow.

== Website Features ==
Let Simon Decide allows users to select from a list of Simon's decisions or to create their own unique decision. Simon's decisions (separated into categories for Education, Lifestyle, Business & Work, Financial, Leisure, Purchase, Health, and Student) feature lists of factors to consider, possible alternatives, and links to resources that are related to the decision. Users can rate the outcome of their decisions and publish a summary of their decision with the community, as well as browse through the decisions of others.

=== Simon's Tools ===
Let Simon Decide currently offers three decision making tools that take between 5 and 10 minutes to use: My Scores, My Life Match, and My Points of View. My Scores is the most logical, fact-based tool, ideal for decisions where the user faces multiple appealing alternatives and factors. The user is asked to list their alternatives, list the factors that are important to their decision, rank these factors in order of importance, and score each alternative against each factor. My Life Match is the most personal tool and considers the user's goals, current situation, personality type, and activities, based on the My Life Profile the user has created. My Points of View is the fastest decision tool and prompts the user to consider his/her decision from four different perspectives.
