= Aboulomania =

Mental disorder in which the patient displays pathological indecisiveness

Aboulomania (from Greek a– 'without' and boulē 'will') is a mental disorder in which the patient displays pathological indecisiveness. The term was created in 1883 by the neurologist William Alexander Hammond, who defined it as: ‘a form of insanity characterised by an inertness, torpor, or paralysis of the will’. It is typically associated with anxiety, stress, depression, and mental anguish, severely affecting one's ability to function socially. In extreme cases, difficulties arising from the disorder can lead to suicide. Although many people are indecisive at times, it is rarely to the extent of obsession.

The part of the brain that is tied to making rational choices, the prefrontal cortex, can hold several pieces of information at any given time. This may quickly overwhelm somebody when trying to make decisions, regardless of the importance of that decision. They may come up with reasons that their decisions will turn out badly, causing them to over-analyze every situation critically in a classic case of paralysis by analysis. Lack of information, valuation difficulty, and outcome uncertainty can become an obsession for those with aboulomania.

Although it is a recognised and diagnosable mental disorder, aboulomania is not recognised by the Diagnostic and Statistical Manual of Mental disorders (DSM-5).

== Symptoms ==
Aboulomania is characterised by great indecision and an inability to, or difficulty in, making any kind of choice in a person's daily life. This significantly affects functioning, specifically the ability to function socially, making it difficult to maintain family and personal relationships.

There is a significant overlap between the symptoms of aboulomania and obsessive compulsive disorder (OCD). With pathological doubt and significant impairment in decision-making being prevalent across both conditions. Many OCD patients can be considered to have a form of pathological indecision, which is also displayed in aboulomania patients.

Some aboulomania symptoms are:

- Lack of self confidence
- Avoiding spending time alone
- High levels of uncertainty and anxiety
- Anticipatory anxiety regarding decisions, usually leading to mental blocks
- Avoiding personal responsibility, e.g. making decisions
- Decision-making process takes a long time
- Decision-making process is extremely difficult
- Difficulty functioning independently or making decisions without support from others
- Over-analysis of situations
- Dysfunctional post-decision behaviour, e.g. worry, re-assessing of decisions
- Obsessing over inability to make decisions

Some level of indecision exists within normal psychopathology, and it has been found that having extensive choice is demotivating to consumers in supermarkets, who prefer limited-choice contexts. However, this indecision is rarely to the extent of obsession. According to the DSM-IV definition, when symptoms become clinically significant, and associated with distress and impairment to the functioning of the individual, they can be considered part of a mental disorder. When the symptoms are relating to indecision this disorder may be aboulomania. It has also been found that indecision is a common characteristic in mental disorders like depression, and is associated with OCD tendencies, conditions both associated with aboulomania.

== Risk factors ==
The underlying causes of aboulomania have not been empirically proven. The factors contributing towards the development of aboulomania are likely a combination of both environmental factors, taking place during development, and biological factors.

=== Biological factors ===
The pre-frontal cortex of the brain, the cortex responsible for decision-making and making conscious decisions, may be directly involved in the condition. It has been found that human patients with damage to their pre-frontal cortex exhibit poor decision-making. It is speculated that individuals suffering from aboulomania have an irregularly functioning pre-frontal cortex, and so develop and obsession with over-analysis and outcome uncertainty regarding decisions.

=== Environmental factors ===
Some researchers believe that parenting styles can lead to the development of aboulomania, especially among individuals susceptible to the disorder due to biological factors. Parenting styles that are overprotective or authoritarian, as well as over-involvement or intrusive behaviours from the primary caregiver, can encourage dependence in the child. Parents will be seen to reward loyalty and reject or punish the child's attempts to gain independence. This creates significant doubts and uncertainty in the individual regarding their ability to function independently of others. Parental over-involvement may arise from the caregiver's own dependency needs, which are fulfilled by the child's dependence.

Individuals with aboulomania have often been socially humiliated by others in their developmental years. Bullying among children is broadly associated with adverse mental health outcomes, such as developing depression and anxiety, conditions both closely associated with aboulomania. Aboulomania development may also be triggered by the shame, insecurities and lack of self-trust which arise from the bullying.

The child develops suspicions that they are incapable of living autonomously, which are then reinforced by the parenting style and behaviours of their primary caregiver. In response to these feelings, they portray a helplessness that elicits caregiving behaviour by others in their lives.

== Diagnosis and treatment ==
For the diagnosis of aboulomania, a mental professional must initially eliminate physical illness or neurological damage as an explanation for the patient's symptoms. To do this, the medical professional must perform physical examinations and a complete medical history. Then the patient can be referred to a psychiatrist who assesses the prevalence of aboulomania using a clinical interview relating to their symptoms.

There are currently no laboratory tests to diagnose aboulomania specifically. But, there are assessment tools available to psychiatrists to aid in the evaluation of aboulomania:

- The Minnesota Multiphasic Personality Inventory (MMPI)
- The Millon Clinical Multiaxial Inventory - Fourth Edition (MCMI-IV)
- The Rorschach Psychodiagnostic Test
- The Thematic Apperception Test (TAT)

Psychotherapy is the preferred method for treating aboulomania, to reduce the adverse effects of patients’ symptoms, which may be similar to those of people suffering from OCD, anxiety or depression. Therapy can be used to help the patient become more independent, one method for this may be assertiveness training to help develop self-confidence.

Medication can also be used to treat patients with aboulomania if it is comorbid with other mental disorders, such as depression or anxiety.

== Criticisms ==
The majority of credible sources used are not specific to aboulomania but have been related to a specific aspect of the mental disorder. For example, the book ‘Preventing Bullying Through Science, Policy, and Practice’ which was connected to the impacts of childhood upbringing on the later development of aboulomania.
