= Decarbonization pathway =

A decarbonization pathway is a way for something, such as a country or energy system, to reach a greenhouse gas emissions target, such as net zero by 2050. Nineteen of the G20 countries have announced net-zero targets for this time frame. Decarbonization pathways aim to limit climate change, and include technology, economy and policy.

Some pathways cover a particular sector: for example, the Road Transport Decarbonization Pathway (RTDP) tool, and the Deep Decarbonization Pathways initiative which is for the energy sector. Whereas others cover a country or city, such as London. There can also be pathways for organizations, such as companies, or things such as buildings. Pathways may include behavioral change, such as sometimes riding a bicycle rather than travelling by car.

Some countries plan and discuss their decarbonization pathways years in advance, for example the 2025 consultation on extending the UK Emissions Trading Scheme beyond 2030. Whereas some other countries have clear targets but the pathways for their sectors to get there is unclear, for example China targets net zero greenhouse gas emissions by 2060 but as of 2024 it is unclear how their iron and steel sector will achieve that.

Mitigation pathways can examine robust solutions in multiple scenarios, by using decisionmaking under deep uncertainty (DMDU) to stress test actions and identify vulnerabilities of pathways.
