= Cross-cultural differences in decision-making =

Decision-making is a mental activity which is an integral part of planning and action taking in a variety of contexts and at a vast range of levels, including, but not limited to, budget planning, education planning, policy making, and climbing the career ladder. People all over the world engage in these activities. The underlying cross-cultural differences in decision-making can be a great contributing factor to efficiency in cross-cultural communications, negotiations, and conflict resolution.

== Culture in decision-making ==
=== Over-generalization in research on decision-making ===
A considerable amount of literature in cognitive science has been devoted to the investigation of the nature of human decision-making. However, a large portion of it discusses the results obtained from a cultural subject pool, predominantly from a pool of American undergraduate students. Notwithstanding this limitation, the results are usually implicitly or explicitly generalized, which gives rise to the home-field disadvantage: when a particular cultural group is taken as a starting point, it becomes much harder for the researches to notice, or to 'mark', the peculiarities existing within the group. As a result, what is characteristic only of the group under study is taken for granted and ascribed to the general population. This tendency is further aggravated when the researcher belongs to the cultural group that they study. In this case, the researcher and the subjects are exposed to the same physical, social, and situational contexts on the daily basis. Much of every-day functioning is automatic, in other words it is driven by the current features of the environment we are in, that are processed without any conscious awareness. This leads to the building of implicit attitude, values, and beliefs, which are hard to spot. They become apparent when individuals or decision-making models from different cultural backgrounds as different culture backgrounds tend to form different mind processing into decision making. For example, westerners tend to form affective processing while easterners tend to form analytical processing. Moreover, Affective or feeling based decision- makings tend to be faster and done spontaneously whereas cognitive or reason-based decision making tends to be deliberate

=== Origin of cross-cultural differences ===
More scientists have recently become involved in conducting studies on decision-making across cultures. The results show that there are in fact cross-cultural differences in behavior in general and in decision-making strategies in particular and thus impel researches to explain their origin. There are a number of most popular and accepted explanations:

Co-Evolution of Genes with Culture Hypothesis. The planet Earth is rich in a variety of geographical zones, all of them differing from one another in climate and living conditions they allow for. Across generations, individuals populating a certain area learn to adopt and pass on to the next generations the cultural traits that promote survival and flourishing within the environment of their locality. As a result, the genes supporting the survival-relevant traits are passed on, while others fade away. In the long run, it becomes the case that it is for the surviving genes to set conditions for the cultural practices to be used and even to create the environment to which the members adapt. The process that changes the frequency of application of cultural traits is influenced by the same forces that determine the remolding of the combination of genetic variants. These forces are natural selection, mutation, drift, and migration. There is however one more force – 'a decision-making force' – in cultural evolution. Since cultural traits are transmitted in the context of interpersonal communication, the cultural variants its participants adopt are influenced by the behavioral choices the 'communicator' and the 'learner' make.

Cultural Heritage Hypothesis. Cultural groups all over the world have developed distinct unique worldviews reflected in their philosophies. The two most often compared are the Eastern philosophy which stems from the Confucian thought and the Western philosophy which is grounded in the Aristotelian thought. While the former sees a part/whole dichotomy relations between the items, with special focus on the relations between the elements of nature rather than on the elements themselves, the latter pays more attention to a one/many dichotomy, where each element is seen as more or less autonomous. These differences are deeply rooted in the collective unconscious and might be accountable for the diversity of individuals' everyday behavior.

Social Orientation Hypothesis. All currently existing cultures can be compared with one another against the Collectivism/Individualism scale. The societies that are usually described as individualistic have the independent social orientation. The differentiating characteristics of those groups are autonomy, self-expression, and the interpretation of happiness as a socially disengaging emotion. The collectivists' societies have interdependent social orientation. Their members endorse harmony, relatedness, and connection, don't view themselves as bounded or separated from others, and experience happiness as a sense of closeness to others. Typically interdependent societies are found among Eastern nations, and independent societies are found among Western nations. Subgroups within a nation can also be compared against Independency/Interdependency scale. For example, the working class in the U.S. tends to be more interdependent compared with the middle class. Numerous factors, such as geographical mobility, industrialization, and political systems, affect the social orientation.

=== Decision-making models ===
Depending on the stance the researcher assumes on the role the culture plays in decision-making, one of the following models is used to think of and predict decision-making behavioral patterns in a given culture:

- The Universal Model. The scientists who use this model usually assume there is only a little difference in how individuals from different cultures make their decisions. The results obtained from one group are attributed to people in general.
- The Dispositional Model. The adherents of the dispositional view acknowledge that there are cross-cultural differences in decision-making and support the cause of cross-cultural research. They assume that whatever differences found in the studies indicate the omnipresence of cultural inclinations in the minds of individuals and are bound to emerge under all circumstances and in all situational contexts.
- The Dynamic Model. The adherents of this view recognize cross-cultural differences as well. They view cultural knowledge not as a monolithic, continuously present construct, but as a set of discrete knowledge that becomes operative as a function of the situation. They also facilitate building and testing nuanced models that capture the dynamics through which culture affects decision makers.

== The effect of culture on decision making ==
=== Cross cultural variances developed as a result of differences in values, beliefs, and philosophies ===
Occidental philosophies are known for the extensive use of analytical thinking – a methodical approach to solving complex problems by breaking them into their constituent parts, and identifying the cause and effect patterns of the constituent parts, while Oriental philosophies are well known for their emphasis on holism – the idea that the properties of a given system cannot be determined or explained by its components' parts alone, but the system as a whole determines how the parts behave. This discrepancy brings about further differences in values and beliefs that can be practically displayed in how different cultures manage their public institutions. For example, culturally determined attitudes towards age, gender roles, and the end result are well reflected in the way these cultures build and run their health-care systems. Oriental cultures hold that age is a proxy to experience and hence to wisdom, that the individual should mind their duty without focusing on the final results of the activity, and that women are best suited to play certain roles. On the other hand, Occidental cultures hold that age is not correlated to wisdom, the individual should focus on the end and drive to achieve it, and women are equal to men in all respects. These differences become obvious when health-care systems of an Oriental and Occidental cultures are compared. In Indian health-care setting customers are much less likely to sue their physicians, – who is usually a representative of an older generation – even when having enough evidence of malpractice, due to the fact that their age is treated as a proxy to experience and knowledge. Hence, the decision to sue a physician for deficiencies doesn't occur as a choice or option to most Indian patients, who are representatives of the Oriental culture. In the Indian setting physicians are, however, normally accountable for the care given, even though rarely blamed for unfavorable results, which can be explained by the fact they hold in high regard the means of an action, and not the end. Another distinguishing feature of Indian hospitals is that women are mostly employed as receptionists, billing clerks, and admission assistants. This trend in hiring policy can be explained against gender and role expectation dimension, and by the inculcated in Oriental cultures belief that each element has a predefined place in the system.

Individuals who come from the Oriental cultures with philosophies promoting holistic thinking are found to be better than their Occidental counterparts at noticing the changes in backgrounds, whereas individuals from Occidental cultures who use analytic reasoning tend to be better at recognizing changes in focal objects [8]. The differences in perception might be the result of different standpoints in the corresponding philosophies. It can be taken into consideration when explaining profound divergences in how willing the Westerners and the Easterners are to compromise when they make consumer choices. Just as much as the low-context Westerners are more likely to notice the changes in the salient objects, they are more likely to believe in a single right answer and pursue even the slightest indication that one option is better than all others, whereas the high-context Easterners begin the decision-making process already favoring the compromise option.

The individuals from high- and low-context cultures also differ in their communication styles. The former prefer the less direct style, and thereby they are less explicit in stating their feelings, desires, and intentions when communicating verbally. The latter, on the contrary, are less likely to camouflage their message and conceal their intentions. The culturally normative communication style also enhances people's responsiveness to the transmitted message and influences the perception of the communicator. It influences hiring decisions. HR agents in low-context cultures are more likely to hire direct, assertive, and somewhat aggressive candidates, whereas the reverse pattern is observed in high-context cultures.

=== Cross-cultural variances developed as a result of differences in social orientation ===
Individuals from different cultures tend to have different views of the self, which affects individuals' cognition, goals in social interactions, and consequently influences their behavior and goals in decision making. Individuals from individualist's cultures tend to have independent self-construal and thus experience happiness as a socially disengaging emotion (e.g., pride), and those from collectivist's cultures tend to have interdependent self-construal and experience happiness as a socially engaging emotion (e.g., peace and harmony). The former are more likely to make decisions to fulfill personal accomplishment, whereas the latter are more likely to make decisions that promote social connectedness. This is reflected in their differences in the teamwork styles. A group composed of members with low independent self-construal prefer the cooperative strategy to the competitive one, whereas a group composed of members with high independent self construal preferred the competitive strategy to the cooperative one.

Individuals from cultures with interdependent social orientation believe that public good overrides individual benefit, whereas individuals from cultures with independent social orientation believe that every individual should strive to achieve their best. Thereby, when engaging in the decision-making process the former are more likely to take into consideration the injunctive norms, guarding stability within the society, while the former are more likely to follow their introjected goals. For instance, Indians are found to accommodate to authority figures and significant others and respond to others' expectations when choosing what clothes to wear for a party, and what advanced training courses to take. In each corresponding case, Americans were more likely to act in accordance with their own beliefs of what will be beneficial to them and didn't demonstrate the 'deference syndrome'. In Western cultures (Independent), strength and integrity are demonstrated by being true to one's own opinions and tastes and not being swayed by social pressure to conform. As opposed to seeing individual freedom as a prerequisite to an authentic life, interdependent cultures evaluate freedom in terms of its costs and benefits to the group. 1411.

In addition to that, individualist societies with dominant with independent self-construal which is typical for western society are more likely to rely on feelings and consequently more impulsive in their decision making compared to people with an interdependent self-construal which more typical for eastern society.

There is a difference in the decision making patterns between cultures with independent and interdependent social orientations in the situations when risk-taking is involved, namely the members of cultural groups with high independency show more risk-aversive behavior. This pattern is observed only when risk is material in its nature, and not observed when risk is of the social nature. The cushion hypothesis attempts to explain this difference. It suggests that members of a collectivist society are more prone to risk-taking in the financial domain, because they know they will more likely receive help from their friends or extended family when they "fall", as collectivism endorses social relatedness and interdependence. Social networks in such societies can serve as potent material-risk insurance and correspond to the notion "social capital". Decision-making in the corporate world of group-oriented societies, however, can be much different. Using the Japanese culture as an example, people in large corporations exhibit a high degree of risk aversion, for fear that a decision with negative consequences will reflect badly on the entire corporation. This is one of the reasons for consensus decision making. Another reason is to keep a surface level harmony by involving as many people as possible.

Risk-aversion tendency among members of individualist societies are observed even in the contexts that involve financial risks only indirectly, for instance in decision-making contexts that involve estimating the risk of revealing private information to gain access to mobile banking.

Affect forecasts play an important role in driving decisions. The members of independent and interdependent societies differ in the degree they rely on the expected enjoyment when making choices. Euro-Canadians, who are representatives of the independent social orientation, place more weight on expected enjoyment, whereas East Asians, who are representatives of the interdependent social orientation, warn against excessive hedonism, as their concern with social obligations precludes the uncompromising pursuit of positive affect. This pattern can be observed in the higher education setting, when Euro-Canadian and East Asian students' choices of what courses to enroll in are compared. Euro-Canadian students show a short-term orientation and tend to enroll in the courses which promise to be fun, whereas East Asian students enroll in the courses which they think will be beneficial for their careers and thus show long-term orientation.

The high degree of tolerance for power distance in interdependent societies reflects the tendency to shun arrogance and consider humility as a virtue at all times in collectivist societies. The tolerance for power distance also has practical implication, for instance, in the tourist decision-making styles. Members of individualist societies with lower levels of tolerance for power distance are less likely to exhibit brand consciousness when making choices concerning their travelling arrangements, compared with their collectivist counterparts.

There are a lot of differences between collectivist and Individualist. For collectivists, when they to buy the brand extension product that low fit to the core product, they will focus not only on how much product fit to the core product but also focus on the size of company to guess the quality of product. In contrast, in the same situation, Individualists will focus on just only how much brand extension product fit to the product and the size of company doesn't matter to guess the quality. For example, If Core product of "A" company is ice cream, High fit product is yogurt, Low fit product is pen. For Collectivist, if The A company is a large company, they might think that the pen maybe have a good quality. But for the Individualist, will think that maybe Pen is not good because it's doesn't fit to the company identity. and These kind of cognitive thinking might effect to decision-making. In term of Marketing, Company Strategy should focus and concern about Corporate identity. Especially, For Collectivists, they believe not only in how much brand extension product fit to core product but also believe in size of company (reliability & Trustworthy).

== The conditions accelerating or hindering the salience of cross-cultural differences in decision making ==
=== Priming ===
The literature on automatic cognition suggests that behavior is shaped by exposure to elements of the social world in a way that occurs below awareness or intention. We learn the stereotyped attitudes which later influence our decisions from the shared schematic representations in a certain culture. When an individual is primed with a concept, often by an implicit instruction to think about it, all the aspects of relevant information become activated and influence decision-making. For example, the individuals who are instructed to underlie all first person plural pronouns in the text are thus primed with the concept of collectivism and then show a statistically significant increase in the inclination to make decisions according with the values of the concept they have been primed with.

=== Time pressure ===
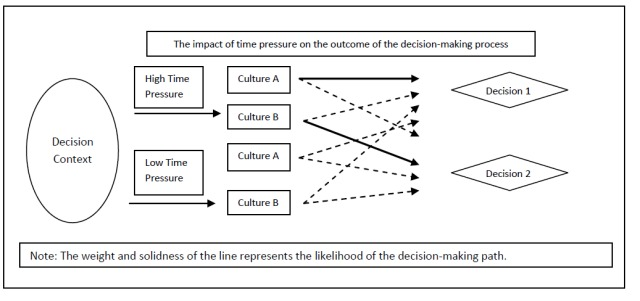

All individuals across cultures have cultural and personal knowledge. Cultural knowledge tends to reflect a large sample of life's events, whereas personal knowledge focuses more on individual or atypical experiences. The other distinction between cultural and personal knowledge is their accessibility. Day after day members of a cultural group are primed with a set of beliefs, attitudes, and behavioral patterns, which contributes to the building-up and storing of the cultural knowledge. Thus cultural knowledge is very accessible, even under high cognitive work load. Personal knowledge is a recording of a single experience and doesn't undergo so many repetitions. That's why it takes a deliberate attempt to access it, which requires more time and effort. Consider the following example. Independent individuals are believed to better respond to promotion-based information, whereas individuals with interdependent self construal are believed to better respond to prevention-based information. In high time pressure condition, this hypothesis is borne out: North Americans are more likely to make up their mind to buy a sun screen having watched a promotion-based commercial, and East Asians are more likely to make the purchase having watched a prevention-based commercial. In the low time pressure condition, when the subjects have more time to deliberate, this difference becomes less salient, or even disappears altogether.

=== Peer pressure ===
Individuals in collectivist cultures are less inclined to act in accordance with their cultural beliefs when they don't experience peer pressure. In accordance with what collectivist culture dictates, Japanese and Chinese students are more likely, compared with American and Italian students, to decide whether they will eat in a fast food restaurants contingent on the norms adopted in their societies, and less likely to make choices contingent on their personal attitudes. However, this peculiarity is much more salient when they make plans whether to eat with their friends and less salient when they decide whether to eat in a fast food restaurant on their own. In the latter context, the likelihood they will act contingent on their attitudes significantly increases.

=== The pressure to provide reasons for the decision ===
Cultural knowledge is recruited when individuals need to provide reasons for their decision. The need to provide reasons evokes an information-processing strategy that relies on top-down application of rules and principles instead of bottom-up processing that relies on personal knowledge. This can be explained with the help of the supposition that individuals feel the pressure to conform when asked to provide reasons, as they don't want to be the outsiders. When they are not asked to explain their choices, they feel freer to rely on their personal knowledge. It has been found that Chinese have a significantly lower tendency to compromise, which earlier on has been found to be one of their characteristic traits, when not asked to provide reasons for their consumer decisions. Americans, on the contrary, are more likely to compromise when they are not accountable to provide explanations for their choice.

=== The individual tolerance for cognitive ambiguity ===
Widely shared cultural knowledge provides individuals with a validated framework to interpret otherwise ambiguous experience, thus providing its followers with a sense of epistemic security and providing protection from the uncertainty and unpredictability. The individuals of all cultures vary in the degree they have a need for firm answers. The individuals with high tolerance for ambiguity are found to be less likely to act with the accordance of their culture.

=== The universal effects of situational demands on decision mode selection across cultures ===
Culture shapes the prevalence of cultural factors – decision content, decision motives, and situational demands and affordances – and shapes how functional factors translate into decision modes – calculation-, recognition-, rule-, role-, and affect-based decision modes. There are, however, a number of universal tendencies across cultures. For example, when action is called for, members of both independent and interdependent social orientations tend to employ role-, rule-, or case-based decision making, as they are much more accessible and allow for less cognitive load, whereas calculation-based mode will be less frequent for relationship decisions in both orientations.

== Modernization and the future of cultural diversity in decision making ==
The more resource-rich the physical environment becomes due to modern technologies, the larger is the number of cultures it can support. The development of technologies that increases the resources extracted from the environment inevitably allows a greater diversity of cultures to occupy a given area. More and more of the cultural variants available to members of a modernized societies are transmitted between people who are not kin, friends, or even acquaintances. Young people are more likely to create novel recombinations of diverse cultural variants. Although the choice is wide, the same range of choices is increasingly available all over the world. Waves of modernization have created complex cultures with substantial diversity within them, but have decreased the inter-group diversity by destroying small-scale variations.
