= Recognition-primed decision =

Decision-making model

Recognition-primed decision (RPD) is a model of how people make quick, effective decisions when faced with complex situations. In this model, the decision maker is assumed to generate a possible course of action, compare it to the constraints imposed by the situation, and select the first course of action that is not rejected. RPD has been described in diverse groups including trauma nurses, fireground commanders, chess players, and stock market traders. It functions well in conditions of time pressure, and in which information is partial and goals poorly defined. The limitations of RPD include the need for extensive experience among decision-makers (in order to correctly recognize the salient features of a problem and model solutions) and the problem of the failure of recognition and modeling in unusual or misidentified circumstances. It appears, as discussed by Gary A. Klein in Sources of Power, to be a valid model for how human decision-makers make decisions.

== Overview ==
The RPD model identifies a reasonable reaction as the first one that is immediately considered. RPD combines two ways of developing a decision; the first is recognizing which course of action makes sense, and the second, evaluating the course of action through imagination to see if the actions resulting from that decision make sense. However, the difference of being experienced or inexperienced plays a major factor in the decision-making processes.

RPD reveals a critical difference between experts and novices when presented with recurring situations. Experienced people will generally be able to come up with a quicker decision because the situation may match a prototypical situation they have encountered before. Novices, lacking this experience, must cycle through different possibilities, and tend to use the first course of action that they believe will work. The inexperienced also have the tendencies of using trial and error through their imagination.

== Variations ==
There are three variations in RPD strategy. In Variation 1, decision makers recognize the situation as typical: a scenario where both the situational detail and the detail of relevant courses of action are known. Variation 1 is therefore essentially an “If… then…” reaction. A given situation will lead to an immediate course of action as a function of the situation's typicality. More experienced decision makers are more likely to have the knowledge of both prototypical situations and established courses of action that is required for an RPD strategy to qualify as Variation 1.

Variation 2 occurs when the decision maker diagnoses an unknown situation to choose from a known selection of courses of action. Variation 2 takes the form of “If (???)... then...,” a phrase which implies the decision maker's specific knowledge of available courses of action but lack of knowledge regarding the parameters of the situation. In order to prevent situational complications and the accrual of misinformation, the decision maker models possible details of the situation carefully and then chooses the most relevant known course of action. Experienced decision makers are more likely to correctly model the situation, and are thus more likely to more quickly choose more appropriate courses of action.

In Variation 3, the decision maker is knowledgeable of the situation but unaware of the proper course of action. The decision maker therefore implements a mental trial and error simulation to develop the most effective course of action. Variation 3 takes the form of “If... then... (???)” wherein the decision maker models outcomes of new or uncommon courses of action. The decision maker will cycle through different courses of action until a course of action appears appropriate to the goals and priorities of the situation. Due to the time constraint fundamental to the RPD model, the decision maker will choose the first course of action which appears appropriate to the situation. Experienced decision makers are likely to develop a viable course of action more quickly because their expert knowledge can rapidly be used to disqualify inappropriate courses of action.

== Application ==
Recognition-primed decision making is highly relevant to the leaders or officers of organizations that are affiliated with emergency services such as fire fighters, search and rescue units, police, and other emergency services. It is applied to both the experienced and the inexperienced, and how they manage their decision making processes. The Recognition-primed decision making model is developed as samples for organizations on how important decisions can affect important situations which may either save lives or take lives. The model developed can be used as a study for organizations to fill in the gaps and to determine which type of RPD variation is more applicable to the organization.

== See also ==
- Decision theory
- Naturalistic decision making
- OODA
