= Mushahada =

Concept in Sufism

Mushahada or Mushahida (contemplation, witnessing), derived from shuhud to witness, is a concept in Sufism. It is the vision 'of' or 'by' God so that the seeker of God may acquire yaqeen which can neither be inherited nor can it be gained through the intellect. The life of a Sufi or a seeker of God is meaningless without Mushahada because his goal is to remain ever-present in the vision of God. The inverse of Mushahada is Hijab i.e. when the Divine Face is veiled which is considered a punishment for a Sufi. "Divine Love leads to Mushahida (the observation of Divinity) and possesses the Essence of the true mystic knowledge but the intellect has superficial knowledge only".

Mushahida is the vision of Allah's blessings, it's hidden knowledge which takes over the seekers of Allah through the spiritual beneficence of their Murshid. In such a state, all they see through their spiritual eye or 'sight' is nothing save Allah. All perception appears to be Allah.

According to a tradition related to the famous mystic Bayazid Bastami, he was asked about his age. He replied, “Four years.” He was asked for an explanation due to his answer to which he replied, “I have been veiled from God by this world for seventy years, but I have seen Him during the last four years; the period in which one is veiled does not belong to one’s life.” "When the views, the viewed and the process of viewing-all are one, I wonder who is observing who is this observation."
