= Intuition and decision-making =

Intuition in the context of decision-making is defined as a "non-sequential information-processing mode." It is distinct from insight (a much more protracted process) and can be contrasted with the deliberative style of decision-making. Intuition can influence judgment through either emotion or cognition, and there has been some suggestion that it may be a means of bridging the two. Individuals use intuition and more deliberative decision-making styles interchangeably, but there has been some evidence that people tend to gravitate to one or the other style more naturally. People in a good mood gravitate toward intuitive styles, while people in a bad mood tend to become more deliberative. The specific ways in which intuition actually influences decisions remain poorly understood.

== Definition and related terms ==
Intuitive decision-making can be described as the process by which information acquired through associated learning and stored in long-term memory is accessed unconsciously to form the basis of a judgment or decision. This information can be transferred through effects induced by exposure to available options, or through unconscious cognition. Intuition is based on the implicit knowledge available to the decision-maker. For example, owning a dog as a child imbues someone with implicit knowledge about canine behavior, which may then be channeled into a decision-making process as the emotion of fear or anxiety before taking a certain kind of action around an angry dog. Intuition is the mechanism by which this implicit knowledge is brought to the forefront of the decision-making process. Some definitions of intuition in the context of decision-making point to the importance of recognizing cues and patterns in one's environment and then using them to improve one's problem solving abilities. Intuition in decision-making has been connected by two assumptions: 1) Tacit decision - previous decisions are affecting and 2) Explicit decision - emotions are affecting.

Intuition's effect on decision-making is distinct from insight, which requires time to mature. A month spent pondering a math problem may lead to a gradual understanding of the answer, even if one does not know where that understanding came from. Intuition, in contrast, is a more instantaneous, immediate understanding upon first being confronted with the math problem. Intuition is also distinct from implicit knowledge and learning, which inform intuition but are separate concepts. Intuition is the mechanism by which implicit knowledge is made available during an instance of decision-making.

== Channels of intuitive influence ==
=== Heuristics ===
Traditional research often points to the role of heuristics in helping people make "intuitive" decisions. Those following the heuristics-and-biases school of thought developed by Amos Tversky and Daniel Kahneman believe that intuitive judgments are derived from an "informal and unstructured mode of reasoning" that ultimately does not include any methodical calculation. Tversky and Kahneman identify availability, representativeness, and anchoring/adjustment as three heuristics that influence many intuitive judgments made under uncertain conditions.

The heuristics-and-biases approach looks at patterns of biased judgments to distinguish heuristics from normative reasoning processes. Early studies supporting this approach associated each heuristic with a set of biases. These biases were "departures from the normative rational theory" and helped identify the underlying heuristics. Use of the availability heuristic, for example, leads to error whenever the memory retrieved is a biased recollection of actual frequency. This can be attributed to an individual's tendency to remember dramatic cases. Heuristic processes are quick intuitive responses to basic questions such as frequency.

=== Affect ===
Some researchers point to intuition as a purely affective phenomenon that demonstrates the ability of emotions to influence decision-making without cognitive mediation. This supports the dual processing theory of affect and cognition, under which conscious thought is not required for emotions to be experienced, but nevertheless positive conscious thoughts towards person's will have positive emotional affects on them. In studies comparing affect and cognition, some researchers have found that positive mood is associated with reliance on affective signals while negative mood is associated with more deliberative thought processes. Mood is thus considered a moderator in the strategic decisions people carry out. In a series of three studies, the authors confirmed that people in a positive mood faced with a card-based gambling task utilized intuition to perform better at higher-risk stages than people who were in a negative mood. Other theories propose that intuition has both cognitive and affective elements, bridging the gap between these two fundamentally different kinds of human information processing.

An experimental field study explored how the decision-making mode influences mood and decision outcomes in a person’s daily life. Findings suggest that intuitive decisions enhance mood more than analytical decisions. The ease of making a decision mediated mood improvement, as intuitive decisions were perceived as easier and therefore strengthening a person’s mood. Interestingly, findings imply that decisions that felt "right," despite how they were made, correlated to an enhanced mood. The study contributes to the theory of intuition and mood regulation. Linking the ease of processing and positive affect shows that positive affect is not only a cause but also an outcome of intuitive decision-making. Similarly, it found that intuitive decisions were more probable to be implemented than analytical ones, presumably because they aligned better with the preferences of the participants, supporting theories that intuition helps with regulation and knowledge of one's self.

=== Decision-Making in Psychology ===
There are two ways that people make decisions on a daily basis. They can either make decisions based on their gut reaction, or they can make decisions by analyzing and weighing the outcomes. It is easier to make a careful and thought-out decision if there are fewer factors to consider. On the other hand, it may be easier to make decisions with a gut reaction if there are too many factors that need to be considered. In order for a gut reaction to be accurate, one must be well-versed in the subject. Some of the knowledge on a certain subject will be consciously learned, but some of the knowledge is also accrued subconsciously. You can learn this knowledge through experiences. We don't know that we have this knowledge, and we can use it without knowing that we are using it. Although it is commonly believed that unconscious thought provides an advantage in decision-making, there have been studies disproving this theory. In a study done in 2008, researchers found that there was little correlation between conscious thought and good decision-making.

=== Rationality and Creativity ===
Much research exists that breaks down the relationship between rationality and intuitiveness, but few look into other aspects of an individuals personality, such as creativity. A study examines how cognitive reflection, creativity, and humor affect decision-making quality. Cognitive reflection has to do with assessing initial thoughts and intuitions, which helps reduce biases and improve one’s judgment. It is essential for rational decision-making, especially in organizational settings, where promoting cognitive reflection can enhance decision quality. This analysis puts emphasis on the effect that rational and intuitive thinking has on decision-making effectiveness. It highlights the value of leaders with a positive, humorous outlook, viewing an individual's creativity and their combination of rational and intuitive thinking. As opposed to the emphasis on purely rational decision-making, researchers suggest that the incorporation of humor and creativity can aid in the enhancement of decision quality, as decisions which are only focused on rationality or intuition are often less effective. The findings add depth and understanding to previously existing theories on welcoming new variables, such as humor and creativity, which can affect how rationality and intuition impact outcomes of decisions.

== Comparison to other decision-making styles ==
Intuitive decision-making can be contrasted with deliberative decision-making, which is based on cognitive factors like beliefs, arguments, and reasons, commonly referred to as one's explicit knowledge. Intuitive decision-making is based on implicit knowledge relayed to the conscious mind at the point of decision through affect or unconscious cognition. Some studies also suggest that intuitive decision-making relies more on the mind's parallel processing functions, while deliberative decision-making relies more on sequential processing.

A review of the current understanding of intuitive decision-making in sports focuses on how intuition develops in dynamic sports. Emphasizing the fact that despite much extensive research, the result of intuitive decision-making remains controversial and not fully understood. They imply that some believe that intuition develops unconsciously, without any form of deliberate thought, while various other individuals stress the role of deliberate cognitive processes in the formation of intuition in the mind. This debate extends to fields like sports psychology. There are contrasting views on how intuitive decision-making can be cultivated in sports, exploring the dual-process theory, which asserts that both systematic (deliberative) and heuristic (intuitive) processes contribute to intuitive decision-making. A key aspect of this question is the kind of role that deliberative processes have on the development of intuition. In cognitive psychology, there is a recognition that intuition is not purely automatic or unconscious. It is suggested that it may occur from deliberative thinking that over time becomes internalized through experience and practice. This uses conscious effort initially, which, later, becomes automatic as patterns are identified and understood. However, the relationship between deliberation (thoughtful analysis) and intuition (gut feelings) is still widely debated.

== Prevalence of intuitive judgment and measurement of use ==
Although people use intuitive and deliberative decision-making modes interchangeably, individuals value the decisions they make more when they are allowed to make them using their preferred style. This specific kind of regulatory fit is referred to as decisional fit. The emotions people experience after a decision is made tend to be more pleasant when the preferred style is used, regardless of the decision outcome. Some studies suggest that the mood with which the subject enters the decision-making process can also affect the style they choose to employ: sad people tend to be more deliberative, while people in a happy mood rely more on intuition.

The Preference for Intuition and Deliberation Scale developed by Coralie Bestch in 2004 measures propensity toward intuitiveness. The scale defines preference for intuition as tendency to use affect ("gut-feel") as a basis for decision-making instead of cognition. The Myers-Briggs Type Indicator is also sometimes used.

== Intuitive decision-making in specific environments ==
=== Management and decision-making ===
Researchers have also explored the efficacy of intuitive judgments and the debate on the function of intuition versus analysis in decisions that require specific expertise, as in management of organizations. In this context, intuition is interpreted as an "unconscious expertise" rather than a traditionally purely heuristic response. Research suggests that this kind of intuition is based on a "broad constellation of past experiences, knowledge, skills, perceptions and feelings." The efficacy of intuitive decision-making in the management environment is largely dependent on the decision context and decision maker's expertise.

The expertise-based intuition increases over time when the employee gets more experience regarding the organization worked for and by gathering domain-specific knowledge. In this context the so-called intuition is not just series of random guesses, but rather a process of combining expertise and know-how with the employee's instincts. Intuitions can, however be difficult to prove to be right in terms of decision-making. It is in most situations likely, that decisions based on intuition are harder to justify than those that are based in rational analysis. Especially in the context of business and organizational decision-making, one should be able to justify their decisions, thus making them purely intuitively is often not possible. It is debated upon whether intuition is accurate, but evidence has been shown that under aforementioned conditions it can. The organizations should not base their decisions on just intuitive or rational analysis. The effective organizations need both rational and intuitive decision-making processes and combination of those. When it comes to the decision maker him/herself, mainly two factors affect the effectiveness of intuitive decision-making. These factors have been found to be the amount of expertise the person has and the individuals processing style.

=== Finance ===
A study of traders from the four largest investment banks in London looked at the role that emotion and expert intuition play in financial trading decisions. This study reported on the differences between how higher and lower performing traders incorporate intuition in their decision strategy, and attributed the success of some higher performing traders to their great disposition to reflect critically about their intuitions. This propensity to think critically about intuition and the source of those hunches served as a distinguishing factor between the higher and lower performing traders included in the study. While successful traders were more open to this critical introspection, lower performing traders were reported to rely on their feelings alone rather than further explore the affective influences for their decisions. Reflection on the origin of feelings by expert traders may be particularly salient given affect-as-information model, which holds that the impact of emotions on behavior is reduced or even disappears when the relevance of those emotions is explicitly called into question. It has been noted in a research, that intuition is used as a method of decision-making in the banking industry. Record shows that intuition is used in combination with pre-existing solution models and previous experiences. Participants of the research also reported to analyse their intuitive decisions afterwards and possibly altering them.

=== High-risk situations ===
Traditional literature attributes the role of judgment processes in risk perception and decision-making to cognition rather than emotion. However, more recent studies suggest a link between emotion and cognition as it relates to decision-making in high-risk environments. Studies of decision-making in high-risk environments suggest that individuals who self-identify as intuitive decision-makers tend to make faster decisions that imply greater deviation from risk neutrality than those who prefer the deliberative style. For example, risk-averse intuitive decision-makers will choose to not participate in a dangerous event more quickly than deliberative decision-makers, but will choose not to participate in more instances than their deliberative counterparts.

=== Strategic decisions ===
Strategic decisions are usually made by the top management in the organizations. Usually strategic decisions also effect on the future of the organization. Rationality has been the guideline and also justified way to make decisions because they are based on facts. Intuition in strategic decision making is less examined and for example can be depending on a case be described as managers know-how, expertise or just a gut feeling, hunch.

== See also ==
- Intuitionistic logic
