= Aron Katsenelinboigen =

American philosopher

Aron Iosifovich Katsenelinboigen
- Арон Иосифович Каценелинбойген
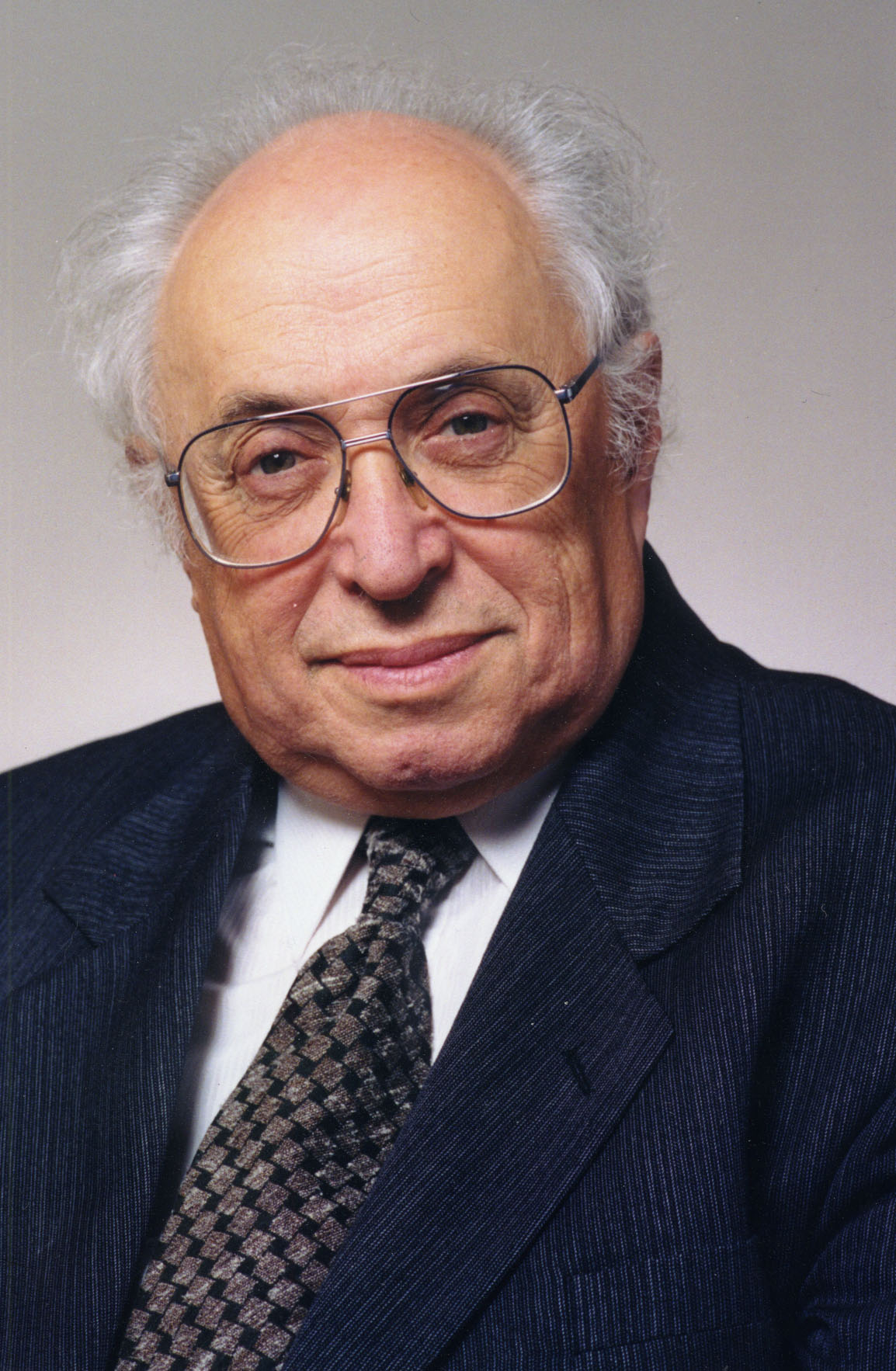
- Aron Katsenelinboigen
- Born: September 2, 1927; Izyaslavl, Ukrainian SSR
- Died: July 30, 2005 (aged 77)
- Employers: Professorship at: University of California, Berkeley; University of Pennsylvania; Princeton University; Wharton School
- Known for: A founder of predispositioning theory

Aron Iosifovich Katsenelinboigen (Russian: Арон Иосифович Каценелинбойген; September 2, 1927 – July 30, 2005) was a founder of predispositioning theory, a subject in decision theory and systems theory that models development in the context of uncertainty.

== Career ==
Katsenelinboigen was born in Izyaslavl in the Ukrainian SSR. At fourteen, he enrolled at the Uzbekistan Institute of Economics, transferring four years later, in 1945, to the Moscow State Institute of Economics. There he graduated the following year and spent a further three years pursuing post-graduate work. He received a PhD in Economics in 1957 and became a Doctor of Economic Science in 1966.

In 1973, Katsenelinboigen emigrated to the United States, where he continued to research indeterministic economics and develop predispositioning theory. He became a United States citizen in 1979. He also began to explore the application of predispositioning theory in fields other than economics, such as biology, psychology and theology. From 1990, when Vera Zubarev became one of his pupils, he and she began researching its application in literature and art.

In 1974, after a brief sojourn at the University of California, Berkeley, Katsenelinboigen joined the Department of Economics at the University of Pennsylvania. During this time, he was also a visiting professor at Princeton University, where he presented a course on the Soviet economy. In 1977, he joined the Wharton School's Department of Social Systems Sciences and became a full professor before moving to the Department of Decision Sciences in 1987. He retired in 2004.

Katsenelinboigen's use of positional and combinational styles of chess as metaphors for the mental processes underlying decision-making continue to be taught by Zubarev at the University of Pennsylvania.

== Books ==
- Automation of Production Processes and Problems of the Organization of Labor, Moscow,"Mashgis," 1956, pp. 1–143. (in Russian)
- The Economic Effectiveness of Complex Mechanization and Automation in Machine Building, Moscow,"Ekonomica,"1959, pp. 1-233. (in Russian)
- The Calculation of Cost of Production in Automated Processes. Moscow, "Finizdat," 1958, pp. 1–87. (in Russian)
- Optimality and the Mechanism of Prices, (together with I. Lakhman and Iu. Ovsienko). Moscow: "Nauka," 1969, pp. 1–124. (in Russian)
- Methodological Problems of the Optimal Planning of a Socialist Economy, (together with Iu.Ovsienko and E.Faerman). Moscow, TSEMI, Academy of Sciences of the U.S.S.R., 1966, pp. 1–246. (in Russian)
- Studies in Soviet Economic Planning, White Plains: M.E. Sharpe Publisher, 1978, pp. 1–229.
- Soviet Economic Thought and Political Power in the U.S.S.R., NY: Pergammon Press, 1980, pp. 1–229.
- Some New Trends in Systems Theory, Seaside, CA.: Intersystems Publications, 1984, pp. 1–269.
- Basic Economics and Optimality (together with S. Movshovich, Iu. Ovsienko), Seaside, CA: Intersystems Publications, 1987, pp. 1–225. The Russian version of the book Growth and Economic Optimum, Moscow: "Nauka," 1972, pp. 1–152.
- Vertical and Horizontal Mechanisms as a System Phenomenon, Seaside, CA: Intersystems Publications,1988, pp. 1–350.
- Soviet Political and Economic System, vol. 1, pp. 7–237; vol. 2, pp. 5–276; vol. 3, pp. 5–311, Benson: Chalidze Publ., 1988. (In Russian).
- Selected Topics in Indeterministic Systems, Seaside, CA: Intersystems Publications, 1989, pp. 1–336.
- The Soviet Union: Empire, Nation, and System. New Brunswick:Transactions, 1990, pp. 1–471.
- The Aesthetic Method in Economics. Benson: Chalidze Publ., 1990, pp. 1–392. (In Russian).
- Indeterministic Economics. New York: Praeger Publ., 1992,
- Russia: Problems and Conflicts. Philadelphia: The Coast Publ., 1993, pp. 1–87. (In Russian).
- Evolutionary Change; Toward a Systemic Theory of Development and Maldevelopment. Newark: Gordon & Breach Publishing Group, 1997, pp. 1–217.
- The Concept of Indeterminism & Its Applications; Economics, Social Systems, Ethics, Artificial Intelligence & Aesthetics. Westport: Greenwood Publishing Group, 1997
- A Conceptual Understanding of Beauty. Lewiston, NY: The Edwin Mellen Press, 2003
- 18 Questions And Answers Concerning The Torah, 2007
- "ВОСПОМИНАНИЯ: "О Времени, О Людях, О Себе"

=== Books edited ===
- Popovsky, M., On the Other Side of the Planet, vol. 1, Philadelphia: Coast, 1994, pp. 1–388 (In Russian).
- Popovsky, M., On the Other Side of the Planet, vol. 2, Philadelphia: Coast, 1995, pp. 1–468 (In Russian).
- Popovsky, M., On the Other Side of the Planet, vol. 3, Philadelphia: Coast, 1996, pp. 1–426 (In Russian).
- An Aesthetic Approach to Live, History, Society, Business, Science, Art & Literature (together with Matthew Mandelbaum). Philadelphia: Friends of Art, 1997, pp. 1–254

=== Translations ===
- “How Keynes Came to America” by John Kenneth Galbraith. Stamford, CT: The Overbrook Press, 1965, pp. 3–18. Translated from English into Russian and published in Ekonomika I Matematicheskie Metody, vol.33, no. 4, 1997, pp. 66–73.
