= Susana Mourato =

British environmental economist

- Education: Catholic University of Portugal (B.A.) NOVA University Lisbon (M.Sc.) University College London (Ph.D.)
- Occupation: Economist Author Researcher
- Known for: Environmental economics

Susana Mourato is a professor of environmental economics at the London School of Economics and Political Science. She holds a leader position at the Grantham Research Institute on Climate Change and the Environment.

== Education and career ==
Mourato graduated with a Licentiate in economics from the Catholic University of Portugal. She then received her M.Sc. in economics from NOVA University Lisbon and a Ph.D. in environmental economics from University College London (1994–1998). She started her professional teaching career at the Catholic University of Portugal as a lecturer and researcher (1987–1994). After receiving her doctorate, she was appointed senior lecturer of environmental economics at Imperial College London (1998–2008). Currently, she is a professor of environmental economics, at the London School of Economics (2008–present) and the head of department of geography and environment since 2017.

Mourato is also a Fellow at the Centre for Social and Economic Research on the Global Environment (CSERGE) at the University of East Anglia. She is involved in Climate for Culture, part of the Framework Programmes for Research and Technological Development, an ecosystem services work package for the UK National Ecosystem Assessment, and the United Nations Development Programme.

== Research ==
Mourato's research interests are in economic valuation, cost–benefit analysis, well-being and life satisfaction, and cultural heritage, with a focus on economic valuation methods for the environment and its association to health impacts, ecosystem services and climate change. She has published articles in the Journal of Environmental Economics and Policy, Global Environmental Change, Oxford Review of Economic Policy, Ecological Economics, and Energy Policy. Other works include co-authored books such as Economic Valuation with Stated Preference Techniques in association with the UK government, and the OECD Cost-Benefit Analysis and the Environment: Further Developments and Policy Use. Her current work examines the monetary values associated with environmental impacts on UK-based policies using a cost-benefit analysis approach, and the perception and effectiveness of re-introducing nuclear technology in Italy.

== Selected Scholarship and Publications ==
=== Economic Valuation with Stated Preference Techniques: A Manual (2002) ===
In conjunction with the UK Department of Transport, Susana Mourato along with co-authors Ian Bateman, Richard Carson, Brett Day, Michael Hanemann, Nick Hanley, Michael Jones-Lee, Graham Loomes, Ece Ozdemiroglu, David Pearce (economist), Robert Sugden (economist), and John Swanson compiled a manual used for guiding stakeholders to assess and evaluate the monetary values of such usage and impacts from ecosystem services. The book suggests using stated preference techniques to determine the value of non-market goods and environmental effects for cost–benefit analysis. Within the book, the chapters are divided into several focuses including: economic values, measurement and techniques of economic values, stages of stated preference work and organizing the results. The authors outline the steps necessary to conduct a stated preference study by using two alternate methods: choice modelling and contingent valuation. These surveying methods concentrates on the willingness to pay by consumers and with the collected sample data to be analyzed through various statistical tests. The manual is recommended for assessing data values in policy decision making.

=== "Are We Willing to Pay Enough to 'Back the Bid'? Valuing the Intangible Impacts of London's Bid to Host the 2012 Summer Olympic Games" (2008) ===
In conjunction with Giles Atkinson, Stefan Szymanski and Ece Özdemiroğlu, Susana Mourato and her colleagues examines the willingness to fund the 2012 Summer Olympics held in London, England. Cost-benefit analysis are often used prior to the Olympic Games in determining the economic benefits from hosting these events. However, the selected approach was the contingent valuation method focusing on the intangible costs and benefits. Each participant, given a categories list of benefits and costs was asked to score them out of 100. The responses highlighted the relative importance of categories including a sense of national pride, environmental developments, promoting healthy living, increased risks, and transport congestions. Using a period of 10 years, results reported an average household yearly WTP of £22 (London), £11 (Glasgow), and £12 (Manchester). They found on the benefit categories ranking that "motivating/inspiring children"; "united people/feel-good factor/national pride"; and "legacy of sporting facilities" were the top three rated across all three cities of the study. On the other hand, the top three ranked intangible cost categories include: "increased safety and security risks"; "transport delays"; and "crowding". The preference of London residents for funding was through an increase in Council Tax, however, Manchester and Glasgow residents opted for the 10 year voluntary contribution instead. The paper suggests an analysis of the willingness to pay effectively explains the net benefits in favour of other forms of economic impact assessments.

=== "The Amenity Value of English Nature: A Hedonic Price Approach" (2013) ===
Together with Stephen Gibbons and Guilherme M. Resende, Mourato has researched the impact of property prices associated with the desirability and amenity value of natural environments. They used the hedonic price method to broaden current evidence on environmental values by gathering a sample data of 1 million housing prices and transactions in Great Britain over a 13-year period (1996–2008). This data along with environmental variables and control variables were analyzed using the ordinary least squares regression approach. The resulting coefficients corresponds to a percent change in price compared to a change in the variables. The authors found with every 1 kilometre distance away from natural amenities, it negatively correlates to prices. They concluded on average the premium UK residents were willing to pay for proximity to environmental amenities was £1765 yearly.

=== "Happiness is Greater in Natural Environments " (2013) ===
George MacKerron and Susana Mourato explores the link between human well-being and their presence in the environment that affect one's happiness scale. This paper builds on the foundation of past research to explain how happiness is tied to nature. To determine the momentary well-being, physically and mentally, the authors developed a user interactive IOS application, Mappiness. MacKerron and Mourato employed the experience sampling method based on subjective well-being. The app with extensive promotion and coverage in the media collected questionnaire data based on GPS coordinates from 21,947 UK participants for the study. Individuals responded to a series of signals where the data were embedded with three indicators of spatial statistics: land cover classification, weather, and daylight setting. Through an analysis, the study explained habitat, land cover or other variables to individual happiness. The authors reported that outdoor environment was positively correlated to happiness, well-being, and health. Moreover, as the majority of higher return to happiness occurred outdoors, seaside locations scored 6 points higher on a 0 to 100 scale than in a conurbation.

=== "Are We Willing to Give What It Takes? Willingness to Pay for Climate Change Adaptation in Developing Countries" (2015) ===
This paper by Susana Mourato and Tanya O'Garra explores the necessary shifts toward climate change adaptation and mitigation policies in developing countries. Resilience to climate change effects requires rigorous strategies and an available amount of resources, amongst those is capital accumulation with the support from financial and investment institutions such as the World Bank and Green Climate Fund. The authors conducted a study with a sample of 1066 electronic surveys using the contingent valuation method for willingness to pay in the form of taxes. Steps taken to conduct the analysis include: ensuring participant awareness of climate change, selecting a valuation technique and deriving the willingness to pay for an individual. It was found that the willingness to pay by United Kingdom residents to fund developing countries' adaptation to climate change was £27 or $30 USD per year. Further calculations reports on average per year, an individual's tax would have to be between $100 and $140 USD to be sufficient to properly fund the adaptation initiative. From the surveys, 45.7% of the participants were not willing to pay by way of income tax deductions. Furthermore, Mourato and O'Garra suggest more effective communication between a stakeholder's personal beliefs and understanding contributes to forming choices on public support towards successful adaptation.

== Select bibliography ==
=== Books ===
- Economic valuation with stated preference techniques : a manual. Bateman, Ian., Great Britain. Department for Transport. Cheltenham, UK: Edward Elgar. 2002. ISBN 1-84064-919-4. OCLC 48980050.

=== Journal articles ===
- Atkinson, Giles; Mourato, Susana; Szymanski, Stefan; Ozdemiroglu, Ece (2008-02-01). "Are We Willing to Pay Enough to 'Back the Bid'?: Valuing the Intangible Impacts of London's Bid to Host the 2012 Summer Olympic Games". Urban Studies. 45 (2): 419–444. doi:10.1177/0042098007085971. ISSN 0042-0980. S2CID 154845698.
- Atkinson, Giles; Mourato, Susana (2008-10-16). "Environmental Cost-Benefit Analysis". Annual Review of Environment and Resources. 33 (1): 317–344. doi:10.1146/annurev.environ.33.020107.112927. ISSN 1543-5938. S2CID 59460220.
- Gibbons, Steve; Mourato, Susana; Resende, Guilherme (2014-02-01). "The Amenity Value of English Nature: A Hedonic Price Approach". Environmental and Resource Economics. 57 (2): 175–196. doi:10.1007/s10640-013-9664-9. S2CID 53131714.
- MacKerron, George; Mourato, Susana (2013-10-01). "Happiness is greater in natural environments". Global Environmental Change. 23 (5): 992–1000. doi:10.1016/j.gloenvcha.2013.03.010. ISSN 0959-3780.
- O'Garra, Tanya; Mourato, Susana (2016-09-01). "Are we willing to give what it takes? Willingness to pay for climate change adaptation in developing countries". Journal of Environmental Economics and Policy. 5 (3): 249–264. doi:10.1080/21606544.2015.1100560. ISSN 2160-6544. S2CID 154707273.
