= Graham Loomes =

British economist and academic

Graham Loomes FBA
- Born: 5 August 1950 (age 76)
- Title: Professor of Economics and Behavioural Science
- Children: Three
- Awards: Fellow of the British Academy (2010)

Academic background
- Education: Christ's Hospital; Westminster City School
- Alma mater: University of Essex; Birkbeck College, University of London

Academic work
- Discipline: Behavioural economics Health economics Experimental economics
- Institutions: University of Newcastle; University of York; University of East Anglia; University of Warwick

Graham Loomes (born 5 August 1950) is a British economist and academic, specialising in behavioural economics. Since 2009, he has been Professor of Economics and Behavioural Science at the University of Warwick. He previously worked at the University of Newcastle, the University of York and the University of East Anglia.

== Early life and education ==
Loomes was born on 5 August 1950 to Frederick and Gladys Loomes. He was educated at Christ's Hospital, a private school in Horsham, West Sussex, and at Westminster City School, then an all-boys grammar school in Westminster, London. He studied economics at the University of Essex, and graduated with a Bachelor of Arts (BA) degree in 1970. After a period as a teacher, he undertook postgraduate studies in economics at Birkbeck College, University of London and graduated with a Master of Science (MSc) degree in 1978.

== Academic career ==
Loomes began his academic career as a teacher rather than a lecturer. Having graduated from university in 1970, he became a school teacher. He left this career in 1977 to return to university and study for a master's degree.

In 1978, after completing his master's degree, he joined the University of Newcastle as a research officer in its Department of Economics. He then moved to the Health Care Research Unit, where he was a lecturer. From 1984 to 1988, he was a senior lecturer and director of the graduate program in health economics at the University of York. From 1988 to 1995, he was Co-Director of the Centre for Experimental Economics. In 1991, he was appointed Professor of Economics.

From 1999 to 2000, he was both Co-Director of the Centre for Experimental Economics at York and Co-Director of the Centre for the Analysis of Safety Policy and Attitudes to Risk at the University of Newcastle. From 2001 to 2009, he was Professor of Economic Behaviour and Decision Theory at the University of East Anglia. In 2009, he joined the University of Warwick as Professor of Economics in its Economics Department. In 2011, he was also appointed Professor of Behavioural Science at Warwick Business School.

== Personal life ==
Loomes has three children; one son and two daughters.

== Honours ==
In 2008, Loomes was awarded an Economic and Social Research Council Professorial Fellowship. In 2010, he was elected a Fellow of the British Academy (FBA).

== Selected works ==
- Weber, Elke U.; Baron, Jonathan; Loomes, Graham, eds. (2001). Conflict and tradeoffs in decision making. Cambridge: Cambridge University Press. ISBN 978-0521772389.
- Bateman, Ian J.; Carson, Richard T.; Day, Brett; Hanemann, Michael; Hett, Tannis; Hanley, Nick; Jones-Lee, Michael; Loomes, Graham; Mourato, Susana; Ozdemiroglu, Ece; Pearce, David W.; Sugden, Robert; Swanson, John (2002). Economic valuation with stated preference techniques: a manual. Cheltenham: Edward Elgar Publishing. ISBN 978-1840649192.
- Bardsley, Nicholas; Cubitt, Robin; Loomes, Graham; Moffatt, Peter; Starmer, Chris; Sugden, Robert (2009). Experimental economics: rethinking the rules. Princeton: Princeton University Press. ISBN 978-0691124797.
