= VHPready =

VHPready (abbreviation for Virtual Heat and Power Ready) is an open industry standard for the control of decentralised power generation plants, consumers and energy storage systems via a central control centre. The uniform use of this standard enables the flexible connection of decentralized power plants to virtual power plants and Smart Grid applications.

VHPready was originally developed by Vattenfall on the basis of international communication standards and was initially used to network its own plants. At the beginning of 2014, Vattenfall handed over the standard with all rights to the Industrieforum VHPready e. V., which had been significantly prepared by the Fraunhofer Institute for Open Communication Systems (FOKUS) and took over the further development and dissemination as an international industry standard.

== Background ==
In the wake of the energy revolution, decentralised power generation plants such as wind power plants, photovoltaic plants, biogas plants, small hydropower plants and mini or micro combined heat and power plants, as well as controllable consumers and energy storage systems, are becoming increasingly important. One approach to integrating them into the energy supply and exploiting synergies is to interconnect these decentralised plants to form virtual power plants. These can help to intelligently orchestrate and reconcile consumption and generation, which should lead to better integration of renewable energies and decentralised plants, a reduction in the maximum load on the grids and cost advantages for market participants. An intelligent power grid (see Smart Grid) plays a key role in this. Various price mechanisms, some of which are already in use today (see standard power), can serve as an incentive for providing this so-called flexibility.

Up to now, the connection of the plants has been carried out by manufacturer-specific information and communication standards using different data models. With the aid of an open industry standard and certification of the decentralised plants, the process for connection and pre-qualification is to be facilitated and shortened.

== History ==
2011

- Vattenfall develops the standard on the basis of international communication standards, initially to network its own plants.

2012

- Vattenfall releases version 3.0 of the VHPready specification

2013

- Due to the interest in the specification, it was decided to develop an open industry standard for general use.

2014

- Foundation of the Industrieforum VHPready e.V. as a competition-neutral and cross-sector platform for the further development of the standard and the certification of standard-compliant plant components.
- Vattenfall hands over the standard with all results and rights to the industrial forum VHPready e. V.

2015

- Publication of the white paper of the specification VHPready 4.0, developed by the members.
- Foundation of VHPready Services GmbH, which is responsible for the implementation and international dissemination of the standard.

2017

- Publication of the specification VHPready 4.0 at the E-world energy & water

2019

- The remaining members of the VHPready e.V. agreed on liquidation of VHPready e.V. in a general meeting on 29.11.2019.

== Scope and certification ==
VHPready comprises different requirements regarding system configuration as well as necessary control and measuring elements. Supported plant types range from power generation plants to energy storage units and consumers.

Certification is carried out by VHPready Services GmbH and accredited testing laboratories. After receipt of an application for the VHPready certificate, testing laboratories are commissioned to test the respective systems on the basis of the technical requirements.

The process is divided into two stages: first, the systems are tested against specifications by means of conformity tests. They begin with the static testing of the properties specified by the manufacturer. This is followed by the verification of the dynamic properties, i.e. tests under controlled conditions. In the second stage, end-to-end tests are carried out using reference systems. After successful testing and acceptance of the test report by VHPready Services GmbH, the systems receive a product-related VHPready certificate. Changed products require recertification.

== Technical details ==
In order to obtain the VHPready certificate, the plants must meet certain minimum requirements. These ensure that a technical connection to a virtual power plant runs smoothly. They concern, among other things, the connection protocols used, technical performance requirements, security of data transmission and types of commands to the plants. The focus is on data communication, remote monitoring and remote control of the equipment.

The current version of the specification is VHPready 4.0. The functional core of VHPready 4.0 is an extensive data point list. It supports the integration of different energy systems into virtual power plants. The telecontrol protocol IEC 60870-5-104 or a modelling according to IEC 61850-7-420 is used for this purpose. In addition to a plant park with a network of different energy systems, this data point list enables the integration of block-type thermal power stations (CHPs), wind power and solar plants, heat pumps, batteries, electric heaters, boiler and buffer storage. In addition, there are data points for meters and external signalling contacts. The security of data transmission is guaranteed by the establishment of a virtual private network (VPN) based on OpenVPN with SSL/TLS connections (Secure Sockets Layer, Transport Layer Security).

An essential goal of VHPready is the definition of subsets or profiles of the standards used, so that only the profile has to be named during certification and project realization. Project-specific agreements on the details of the standards are thus largely eliminated. All tests for certification to the VHPready standard follow internationally standardized methods and techniques as defined by ISO/IEC and ETSI.

== Members of Industry Alliance VHPready e.V. ==
The member companies participated in the initiative for the integration and standardization of decentralized energy systems. The members include manufacturers of system components, providers of software and IT services, network operators, test service providers as well as companies from research and development.

The members of the Industry Alliance VHPready e.V. designed new application areas for new use cases of the VHPready specifications. In working groups the technical advancements of the industry standard were compiled together, application scenarios have been developed, testing and certification processes were modeled as well as positions and strategies of the industry forum for the public work were conceived. The development statuses were available to the member companies ahead of time. This allowed them to test the VHPready communication in their products and in interaction with the systems of other member companies even before the publication, for example during a Plugfest.
