= Wald's maximin model =

Non-probabilistic decision-making model

In decision theory and game theory, Wald's maximin model is a non-probabilistic decision-making model according to which decisions are ranked on the basis of their worst-case outcomes – the optimal decision is one with the least bad outcome. It is one of the most important models in robust decision making in general and robust optimization in particular.

It is also known by a variety of other titles, such as Wald's maximin rule, Wald's maximin principle, Wald's maximin paradigm, and Wald's maximin criterion. Often 'minimax' is used instead of 'maximin'.

== Definition ==
This model represents a 2-person game in which the $\max$ player plays first. In response, the second player selects the worst state in $S(d)$, namely a state in $S(d)$ that minimizes the payoff $f(d,s)$ over $s$ in $S(d)$. In many applications the second player represents uncertainty. However, there are maximin models that are completely deterministic.

The above model is the classic format of Wald's maximin model. There is an equivalent mathematical programming (MP) format:

$$v^{*}:= \max_{d\in D,\,z\in \mathbb{R}} \{z: z \le f(d,s),\forall s\in S(d)\}$$

where $\mathbb{R}$ denotes the real line.

As in game theory, the worst payoff associated with decision $d$, namely

$$v(d):= \min_{s\in S(d)} f(d,s)\ , \ d \in D$$

is called the security level of decision $d$.

The minimax version of the model is obtained by exchanging the positions of the $\max$ and $\min$ operations in the classic format:

$$v^{\circ}:= \min_{d\in D}\max_{s\in S(d)}f(d,s).$$

The equivalent MP format is as follows:

$$v^{\circ}:= \min_{d\in D,\,z\in \mathbb{R}} \{z: z \ge f(d,s),\forall s\in S(d)\}$$

== History ==
Inspired by game theory, Abraham Wald developed this model as an approach to scenarios in which there is only one player (the decision maker). Player 2 showcases a gloomy approach to uncertainty. In Wald's maximin model, player 1 (the $\max$ player) plays first and player 2 (the $\min$ player) knows player 1's decision when he selects his decision. This is a major simplification of the classic 2-person zero-sum game in which the two players choose their strategies without knowing the other player's choice. The game of Wald's maximin model is also a 2-person zero-sum game, but the players choose sequentially.

With the establishment of modern decision theory in the 1950s, the model became a key ingredient in the formulation of non-probabilistic decision-making models in the face of severe uncertainty. It is widely used in diverse fields such as decision theory, control theory, economics, statistics, robust optimization, operations research, philosophy, etc.

== Example ==
One of the most famous examples of a Maximin/Minimax model is

$$\min_{x\in \mathbb{R}} \max_{y\in \mathbb{R}}\ \{x^{2} - y^{2}\}$$

where $\mathbb{R}$ denotes the real line. Formally we can set $D=S(d)=\mathbb{R}$ and $f(d,s)=d^{2}-s^{2}$. The picture is this

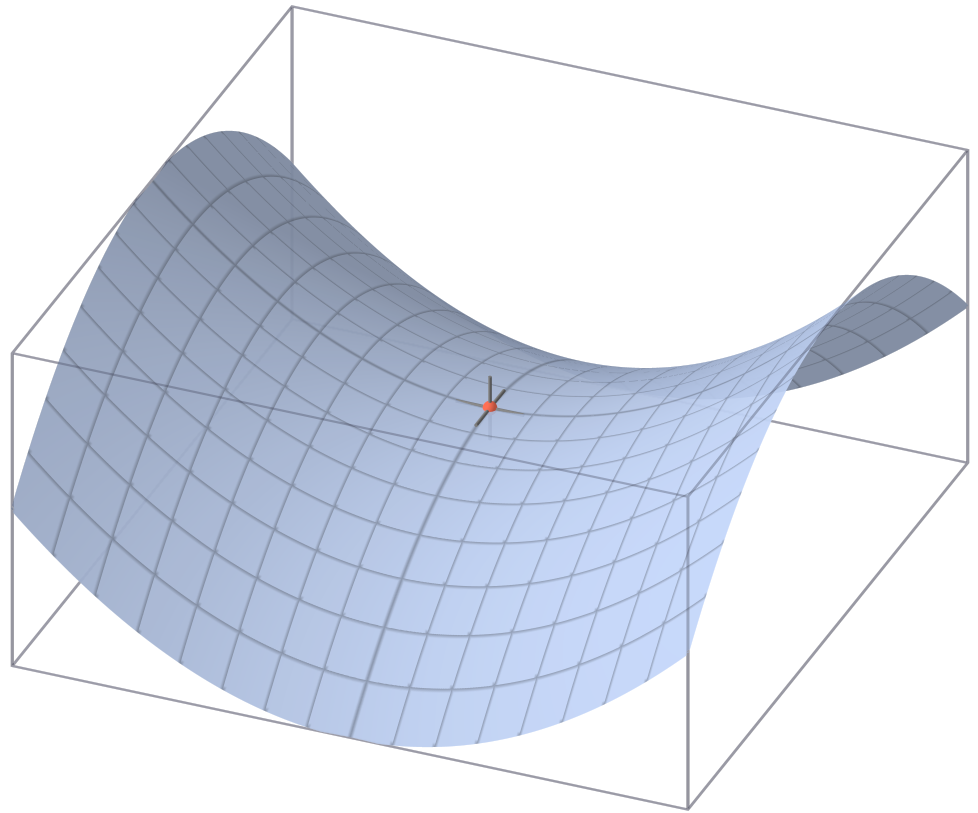

The optimal solution is the (red) saddle point $(x,y)=(0,0)$.

== Decision tables ==
There are many cases where it is convenient to 'organize' the Maximin/Minimax model as a 'table'. The convention is that the rows of the table represent the decisions, and the columns represent the states.

=== Example ===
Henri is going for a walk. The sun may shine, or it may rain. Should Henri carry an umbrella? Henri does not like carrying an umbrella, but he dislikes getting wet even more. His "payoff matrix", viewing this as a Maximin game pitting Henri against Nature, is as follows.

	Sun	Rain
No umbrella	5	−9
Umbrella	1	−5

Appending a Worst Payoff column and a Best Worst Payoff column to the payoff table, we obtain

	Sun	Rain	Worst Payoff	Best Worst Payoff
No umbrella	5	−9	−9	
Umbrella	1	−5	−5	−5

The worst case, if Henri goes out without umbrella, is definitely worse than the (best) worst case when carrying an umbrella. Therefore, Henri takes his umbrella with him.

== Variations on a theme ==
Over the years a variety of related models have been developed primarily to moderate the pessimistic approach dictated by the worst-case orientation of the model. For example,

=== Savage's minimax regret ===
Savage's minimax regret model is associated with the payoff regrets.

== Deterministic models ==
The sets of states $S(d),d\in D,$ need not represent uncertainty. They can represent (deterministic) variations in the value of a parameter.

=== Example ===
Let $D$ be a finite set representing possible locations of an 'undesirable' public facility (e.g. garbage dump), and let $S$ denote a finite set of locations in the neighborhood of the planned facility, representing existing dwellings.

It might be desirable to build the facility so that its shortest distance from an existing dwelling is as large as possible. The maximin formulation of the problem is as follows:

$$\max_{d\in D}\min_{s\in S} dist(d,s)$$

where $dist(d,s)$ denotes the distance of $s$ from $d$. Note that in this problem $S(d)$ does not vary with $d$.

In cases where is it desirable to live close to the facility, the objective could be to minimize the maximum distance from the facility. This yields the following minimax problem:

$$\min_{d\in D}\max_{s\in S} dist(d,s)$$

These are generic facility location problems.

== Maximin models in disguise ==
Experience has shown that the formulation of maximin models can be subtle in the sense that problems that 'do not look like' maximin problems can be formulated as such.

=== Example ===
Consider the following problem:

Given a finite set $X$ and a real valued function $g$ on $X$, find the largest subset of $X$ such that $g(x) \le 0$ for every $x$ in this subset.

The maximin formulation of this problem, in the MP format, is as follows:

$$\max_{Y\subseteq X} \ \{|Y|: g(x)\le 0,\forall x\in Y\}.$$

Generic problems of this type appear in robustness analysis.

It has been shown that the radius of stability model and info-gap's robustness model are simple instances of Wald's maximin model.

== Constrained maximin models ==
Constraints can be incorporated explicitly in the maximin models. For instance, the following is a constrained maximin problem stated in the classic format

$$v^{*}:= \max_{d\in D}\min_{s\in S(d)}\ \{f(d,s): g(d,s) \le 0, \forall s\in S(d)\}.$$

Its equivalent MP format is as follows:

$$v^{*}:= \max_{d\in D,\,z\in \mathbb{R}} \{z: z \le f(d,s), g(d,s) \le 0, \forall s\in S(d)\}.$$

Such models are very useful in robust optimization.

== The price of robustness ==
One of the 'weaknesses' of the Maximin model is that the robustness that it provides comes with a price. By playing it safe, the Maximin model tends to generate conservative decisions, whose price can be high. The following example illustrates this important feature of the model.

=== Example ===
Suppose there are two options, x' and $x''$, and where $S(x')=S(x'')=[a,b]$. The model is then as follows:

$$\max_{d\in D}\min_{s\in S(d)} f(d,s) = \max_{d\,',d\,''}\ \min_{a\le s \le b}f(d,s) = \max\ \{\min_{a\le s \le b}f(d\,',s),\min_{a\le s\le b}f(d\,'',s)\}$$

== Algorithms ==
There are no general-purpose algorithms for the solution of maximin problems. Some problems are very simple to solve, others are very difficult.

=== Example ===
Consider the case where the state variable is an "index", for instance let $S(d)=\{1,2,\dots,k\}$ for all $d \in D$. The associated maximin problem is then as follows:

$$\begin{align}\max_{d\in D}\min_{s\in S(d)} f(d,s) &= \max_{d\in D}\min_{1\le s \le k} \{f_{1}(d),\dots,f_{k}(d)\}\\
& = \max_{d\in D, z\in \mathbb{R}} \{z: z\le f_{s}(d),\forall s=1,2,\dots,k\}\end{align}$$

where $f_{s}(d) \equiv f(d,s)$.

If $d\in \mathbb{R}^{n}$, all the functions $f_{s}, s=1,2,\dots,k,$ are linear, and $d\in D$ is specified by a system of linear constraints on $d$, then this problem is a linear programming problem that can be solved by linear programming algorithms such as the simplex algorithm.
