= Swap regret =

Concept of game theory

Swap regret is a concept from online learning and game theory. It is a generalization of regret in a repeated, n-decision game.

== Definition ==
In each round $t$, the learner chooses decision $i$ with probability $x^t_i$ and the utility for decision $i$ is $p^t_i$. A learner's swap-regret is defined to be the following:

$$\mbox{swap-regret}=
\sum_{i=1}^n \max_{j \leq n}\sum_{t=1}^T x^t_i \cdot (p^t_j-p^t_i).$$

Intuitively, it is how much a player could improve by switching each occurrence of decision i to the best decision j possible in hindsight. The swap regret is always nonnegative. Swap regret is useful for computing correlated equilibria.
