= Minimax estimator =

Statistical estimator

In statistical decision theory, a minimax estimator $\delta^M \,\!$ is an estimator which performs best in the worst possible case allowed in a problem. With problems of estimating a deterministic parameter (vector) $\theta \in \Theta$ from observations $x \in \mathcal{X},$ an estimator (estimation rule) $\delta^M \,\!$ is called minimax if its maximal risk is minimal among all estimators of $\theta \,\!$.

== Definition ==
Definition : An estimator $\delta^M:\mathcal{X} \rightarrow \Theta \,\!$ is called minimax with respect to a risk function $R(\theta,\delta) \,\!$ if it achieves the smallest maximum risk among all estimators, satisfying

$$\sup_{\theta \in \Theta} R(\theta,\delta^M) = \inf_\delta \sup_{\theta \in \Theta} R(\theta,\delta). \,$$

== Problem setup ==
An example is the problem of estimating a deterministic (not Bayesian) parameter $\theta \in \Theta$ from noisy or corrupt data $x \in \mathcal{X}$ related through the conditional probability distribution $P(x\mid\theta)\,\!$. The goal is to find a "good" estimator $\delta(x) \,\!$ for estimating the parameter $\theta \,\!$, which minimizes some given risk function $R(\theta,\delta) \,\!$. The risk function (technically a Functional or Operator since $R$ is a function of a function, not function composition) is the expectation of some loss function $L(\theta,\delta) \,\!$ with respect to $P(x\mid\theta)\,\!$. A popular example for a loss function is the squared error loss $L(\theta,\delta)= \|\theta-\delta\|^2 \,\!$, and the risk function for this loss is the mean squared error (MSE).

In general, the risk cannot be minimized because it depends on the unknown parameter $\theta \,\!$ itself, and if the actual value of $\theta \,\!$ were known, there would be no need to estimate it. Therefore, additional criteria for finding an optimal estimator in some sense are required. One such criterion is the minimax criterion.

== Least favorable distribution ==
Logically, an estimator is minimax when it is the best in the worst case. Continuing this logic, a minimax estimator should be a Bayes estimator with respect to a least favorable prior distribution of $\theta \,\!$. To demonstrate this notion denote the average risk of the Bayes estimator $\delta_\pi \,\!$ with respect to a prior distribution $\pi \,\!$ as

$$r_\pi = \int R(\theta,\delta_\pi) \, d\pi(\theta) \,$$

Definition: A prior distribution $\pi \,\!$ is called least favorable if for every other distribution $\pi ' \,\!$ the average risk satisfies $r_\pi \geq r_{\pi '} \,$.

Theorem 1: If $r_\pi = \sup_\theta R(\theta,\delta_\pi), \,$ then:

1. $\delta_\pi\,\!$ is minimax.
2. If $\delta_\pi\,\!$ is a unique Bayes estimator, it is also the unique minimax estimator.
3. $\pi\,\!$ is least favorable.

Corollary: If a Bayes estimator has constant risk, it is minimax. This is not a necessary condition.

Example 1: Unfair coin: The example is the problem of estimating the "success" rate of a binomial variable, $x \sim B(n,\theta)\,\!$. This may be viewed as estimating the rate at which an unfair coin falls on "heads" or "tails". In this case the Bayes estimator with respect to a Beta-distributed prior, $\theta \sim \text{Beta}(\sqrt{n}/2,\sqrt{n}/2) \,$ is

$$\delta^M=\frac{x+0.5\sqrt{n}}{n+\sqrt{n}}, \,$$

with constant Bayes risk

$$r=\frac{1}{4(1+\sqrt{n})^2}  \,$$

and, according to the Corollary, is minimax.

Definition: A sequence of prior distributions $\pi_n\,\!$ is called least favorable if for any other distribution $\pi '\,\!$,

$$\lim_{n \rightarrow \infty} r_{\pi_n} \geq r_{\pi '}. \,$$

Theorem 2: If there are a sequence of priors $\pi_n\,\!$ and an estimator $\delta\,\!$ such that $\sup_\theta R(\theta,\delta)=\lim_{n \rightarrow \infty} r_{\pi_n} \,\!$, then:

1. $\delta\,\!$ is minimax.
2. The sequence $\pi_n\,\!$ is least favorable.

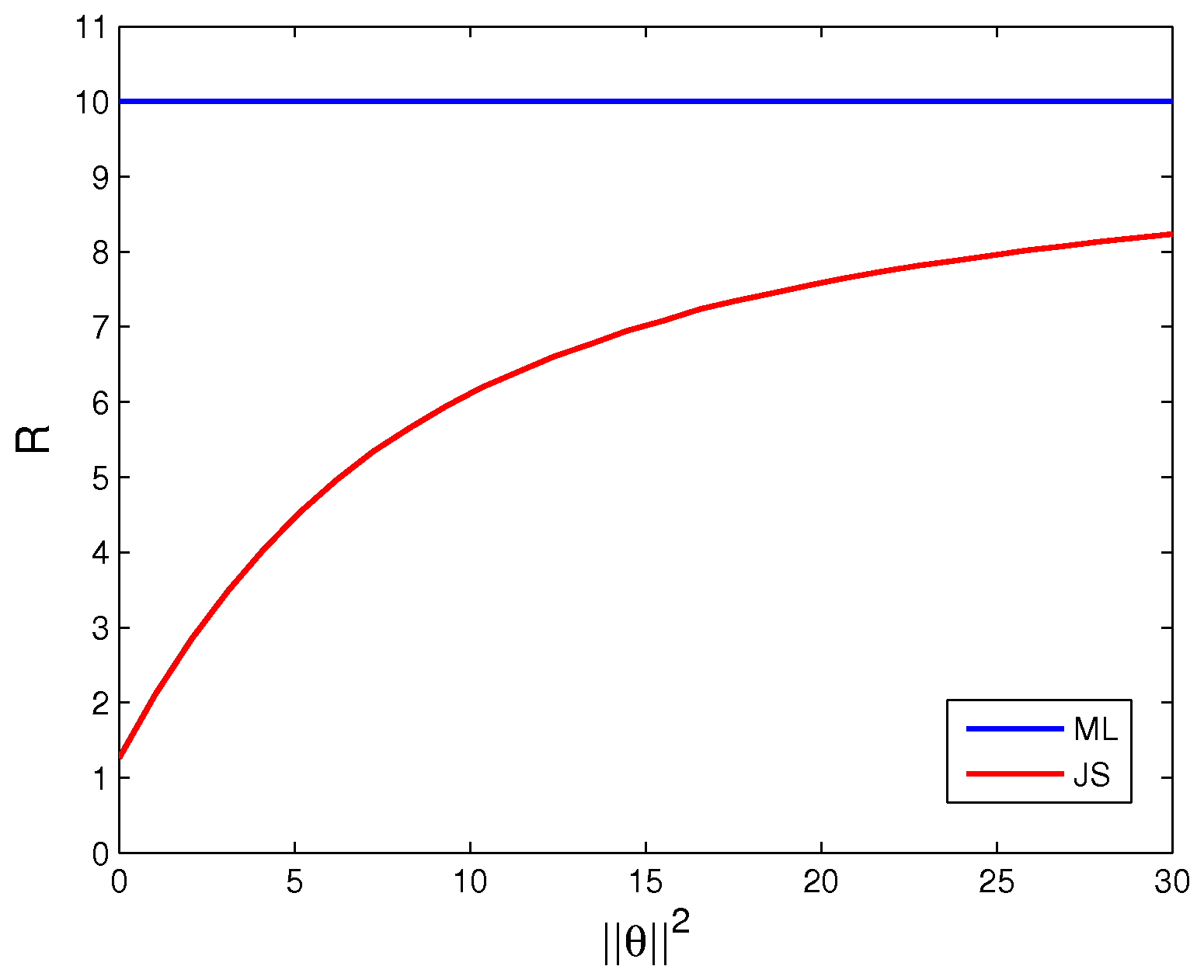
MSE of maximum likelihood estimator versus James–Stein estimator.

No uniqueness is guaranteed. For example, the ML estimator from the previous example may be attained as the limit of Bayes estimators with respect to a uniform prior, $\pi_n \sim U[-n,n]\,\!$ with increasing support and also with respect to a zero-mean normal prior $\pi_n \sim N(0,n \sigma^2) \,\!$ with increasing variance. Neither the resulting ML estimator is unique minimax, nor the least favorable prior is unique.

Example 2: the problem of estimating the mean of $p\,\!$ dimensional Gaussian random vector, $x \sim N(\theta,I_p \sigma^2)\,\!$. The maximum likelihood (ML) estimator for $\theta\,\!$ in this case is $\delta_\text{ML}=x\,\!$, and its risk is

$$R(\theta,\delta_\text{ML})=E{\|\delta_{ML}-\theta\|^2}=\sum_{i=1}^p E(x_i-\theta_i)^2=p \sigma^2. \,$$

The risk is constant, but the ML estimator is not a Bayes estimator, and the Corollary of Theorem 1 does not apply. However, the ML estimator is the limit of the Bayes estimators with respect to the prior sequence $\pi_n \sim N(0,n \sigma^2) \,\!$ and hence, minimax according to Theorem 2. Minimaxity does not always imply admissibility. In this example, the ML estimator is known to be inadmissible (not admissible) whenever $p >2\,\!$. The James–Stein estimator dominates the ML whenever $p >2\,\!$. Though both estimators have the same risk $p \sigma^2\,\!$ when $\|\theta\| \rightarrow \infty\,\!$, and they are both minimax, the James–Stein estimator has smaller risk for any finite $\|\theta\|\,\!$.

== Examples ==
While in general, it is difficult, often impossible to determine the minimax estimator, in many cases, a minimax estimator has been determined.

Example 3: Bounded normal mean: When estimating the mean of a normal vector $x \sim N(\theta,I_n \sigma^2)\,\!$, where it is known that $\|\theta\|^2 \leq M\,\!$. The Bayes estimator with respect to a prior which is uniformly distributed on the edge of the bounding sphere is known to be minimax whenever $M \leq n\,\!$. The analytical expression for this estimator is

$$\delta^M(x)=\frac{MJ_{n+1}(M\|x\|)}{\|x\|J_{n}(M\|x\|)}x, \,$$

where $J_n(t)\,\!$, is the modified Bessel function of the first kind of order n.

== Asymptotic minimax estimator ==
The difficulty of determining the exact minimax estimator has motivated the study of estimators of asymptotic minimax – an estimator $\delta'$ is called $c$-asymptotic (or approximate) minimax if

$$\sup_{\theta\in\Theta} R(\theta,\delta')\leq c \inf_\delta \sup_{\theta \in \Theta} R(\theta,\delta).$$

For many estimation problems, especially in the non-parametric estimation setting, various approximate minimax estimators have been established. The design of the approximate minimax estimator is intimately related to the geometry, such as the metric entropy number, of $\Theta$.

== Randomized minimax estimator ==
A risk set with a minimax rule.

Sometimes, a minimax estimator may take the form of a randomized decision rule. The parameter space has two elements and each point on the graph corresponds to the risk of a decision rule: the x-coordinate is the risk when the parameter is $\theta_1$ and the y-coordinate is the risk when the parameter is $\theta_2$. In this decision problem, the minimax estimator lies on a line segment connecting two deterministic estimators. Choosing $\delta_1$ with probability $1 - p$ and $\delta_2$ with probability $p$ minimises the supremum risk.

== Relationship to robust optimization ==
Robust optimization is an approach to solve optimization problems under uncertainty in the knowledge of underlying parameters. For instance, the MMSE Bayesian estimation of a parameter requires the knowledge of parameter correlation function. If the knowledge of this correlation function is not perfectly available, a popular minimax robust optimization approach is to define a set characterizing the uncertainty about the correlation function, and then pursuing a minimax optimization over the uncertainty set and the estimator respectively. Similar minimax optimizations can be pursued to make estimators robust to certain imprecisely known parameters. For instance, a recent study dealing with such techniques in the area of signal processing can be found in.

In R. Fandom Noubiap and W. Seidel (2001) an algorithm for calculating a Gamma-minimax decision rule has been developed, when Gamma is given by a finite number of generalized moment conditions. Such a decision rule minimizes the maximum of the integrals of the risk function with respect to all distributions in Gamma. Gamma-minimax decision rules are of interest in robustness studies in Bayesian statistics.
