= Robust fuzzy programming =

Mathematical optimization approach

Robust fuzzy programming (ROFP) is a powerful mathematical optimization approach to deal with optimization problems under uncertainty. This approach is first introduced at 2012 by Pishvaee, Razmi & Torabi in the Journal of Fuzzy Sets and Systems. ROFP enables the decision makers to be benefited from the capabilities of both fuzzy mathematical programming and robust optimization approaches. At 2016 Pishvaee and Fazli put a significant step forward by extending the ROFP approach to handle flexibility of constraints and goals. ROFP is able to achieve a robust solution for an optimization problem under uncertainty.

== Definition of robust solution ==
Robust solution is defined as a solution which has "both feasibility robustness and optimality robustness; Feasibility robustness means that the solution should remain feasible for (almost) all possible values of uncertain parameters and flexibility degrees of constraints and optimality robustness means that the value of objective function for the solution should remain close to optimal value or have minimum (undesirable) deviation from the optimal value for (almost) all possible values of uncertain parameters and flexibility degrees on target value of goals".

== Classification of ROFP methods ==
As fuzzy mathematical programming is categorized into Possibilistic programming and Flexible programming, ROFP also can be classified into:

1. Robust possibilistic programming (RPP)
2. Robust flexible programming (RFP)
3. Mixed possibilistic-flexible robust programming (MPFRP)

The first category is used to deal with imprecise input parameters in optimization problems while the second one is employed to cope with flexible constraints and goals. Also, the last category is capable to handle both uncertain parameters and flexibility in goals and constraints.

From another point of view, it can be said that different ROFP models developed in the literature can be classified in three categories according to degree of conservatism against uncertainty. These categories include:

1. Hard worst case ROFP
2. Soft worst case ROFP
3. Realistic ROFP

Hard worst case ROFP has the most conservative nature among ROFP methods since it provides maximum safety or immunity against uncertainty. Ignoring the chance of infeasibility, this method immunizes the solution for being infeasible for all possible values of uncertain parameters. Regarding the optimality robustness, this method minimizes the worst possible value of objective function (min-max logic). On the other hand, Soft worst case ROFP method behaves similar to hard worst case method regarding optimality robustness, however does not satisfy the constraints in their extreme worst case. Lastly, realistic method establishes a reasonable trade-off between the robustness, the cost of robustness and other objectives such as improving the average system performance (cost-benefit logic).

== Applications ==
ROFP is successfully implemented in different practical application areas such as the following ones.

- Supply chain management such as the work by Pishvaee et al. which addresses the design of a social responsible supply chain network under epistemic uncertainty.
- Healthcare management such as the works by Zahiri et al. and Mousazadeh et al. which consider the planning of an organ transplantation network and a pharmaceutical supply chain, respectively.
- Energy planning such as Bairamzadeh et al. which uses a multi-objective possibilistic programming model to deal with the design of a bio-ethanol production-distribution network. Also in another research, Zhou et al. developed a robust possibilistic programming model to deal with the planning problem of municipal electric power system.
- Sustainability such as Xu and Huang which employ ROFP to cope with an air quality management problem.
