= Enpal =

German renewable energy equipment company

- Type: Private limited company (B.V.)
- Industry: Renewable energy
- Founded: 2017
- Headquarters: Berlin, Germany
- Key people: Mario Kohle (CEO), Jochen Christoph Cassel (CFO), Stephan Rink (Chief Sales Officer)
- Revenue: ▲€900 million (2023)
- Number of employees: 2500 (2022)
- Website: www.enpal.de

Enpal is a German renewable energy equipment company based in Berlin that primarily sells and installs photovoltaic systems and heat pumps.

== History ==
Enpal was founded in 2017 and received millions of euros in investment in the early years from German tech investor Lukasz Gadowski, former Zalando board members, and other financiers. Since the beginning of 2021, Enpal has been operating its training center for installers and electricians for photovoltaics.

== Overview ==
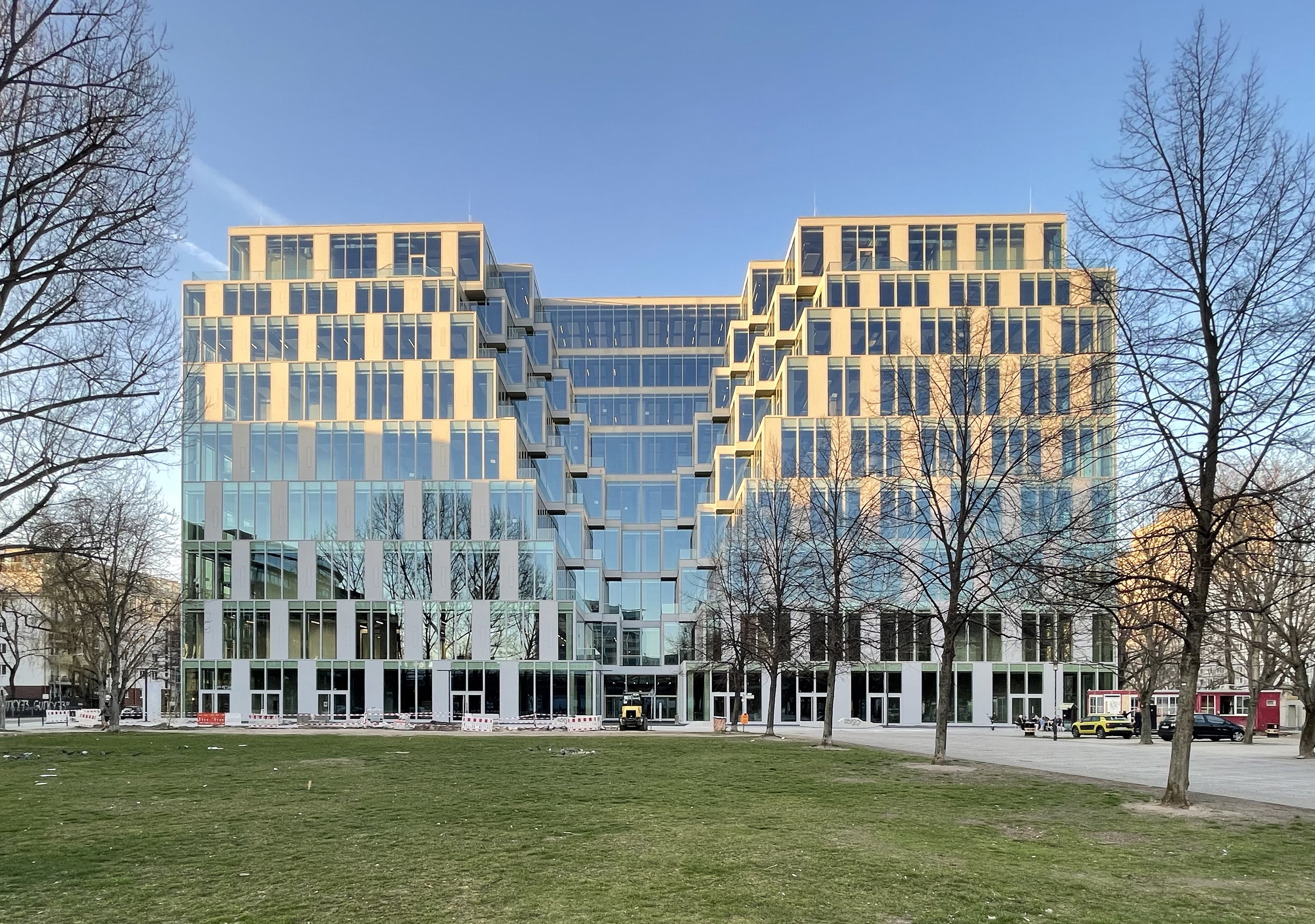
Enpal headquarters in Berlin

Of the three founders Mario Kohle, Jochen Ziervogel, and Viktor Wingert, Mario Kohle is still on the management board today as CEO. Despite being based in Berlin and its business operations mainly being focused on the German market, the company has the Dutch legal form of a BV.

In 2020, Enpal achieved a revenue of 56 million euros and had 324 employees at the end of the year. In the following year, revenue rose to 115 million euros with around 1,000 employees. The company was profitable for the first time in 2022, when revenue rose to almost 415 million euros. In 2023, revenue increased to 900 million euros.

By December 2023, Enpal installed a total of 60,000 solar systems in Germany.

Enpal installs photovoltaic (PV) systems, battery storage systems, wallboxes, smart meters, and heat pumps, and offers an energy management system.
