= Wallbox =

Spanish EV charger company

- Traded as: NYSE: WBX
- Founded: 2015
- Founder: Enric Asunción, Eduard Castañeda
- Headquarters: Barcelona
- Number of employees: 1,400 (2023)
- Website: wallbox.com

Wallbox is a smart electric vehicle charging and energy management provider which designs, manufactures and distributes electric vehicle charging technologies.

== History ==
Wallbox was founded in Barcelona, Spain by Enric Asunción and Eduard Castañeda in 2015 initially using the name Wall Box Chargers. In 2017, Wallbox came first in South Summit, a European startup competition. Wallbox then came in third place at the Startup World Cup in May 2018. In October 2019, Wallbox created Quasar, the world's first bidirectional charger for the residential segment. Quasar was named the Best of Consumer Electronics Show in January 2020.

On June 9, 2021, Wallbox announced a merger with the special-purpose acquisition company Kensington Capital Acquisition Corp. II. The company will raise about $330 million from a range of investors, including Janus Henderson Investors, Luxor Capital, Cathay Innovation and Kensington Capital Partners. The deal closed on October 4, 2021. Wallbox's shares are listed on the New York Stock Exchange under the symbol WBX.

During Super Bowl LVI in Feb. 2022, Wallbox was the first electric vehicle charging company to ever run an ad during the game.

== Acquisition ==
In October 2023, it was announced Wallbox had acquired the Lauf an der Pegnitz-headquartered smart electric vehicle charging and energy management company ABL GmbH for € 15 million.

== Awards ==
- Red Dot Design Award 2019 – Red Dot GmbH & Co. KG
- Best of CES 2020 – Electrek
- Best of CES 2020 – Newsweek
- Best of CES 2020 – Robb Report
- 2020 World Changing Ideas Finalist – Fast Company
- Edison Awards, Silver Winner 2020 – Edison Awards
- Best Transportation Technology CES 2020 – Engadget
- Good Design Award 2021 – The Chicago Athenaeum Museum of Architecture and Design
- Excellent Product Design – Automotive Parts and Accessories German Design Award 2021 – German Design Council
- 2021 World Changing Ideas Finalist – Fast Company
- 2021 Good Design Award
