= W. Michael Hanemann =

American economist

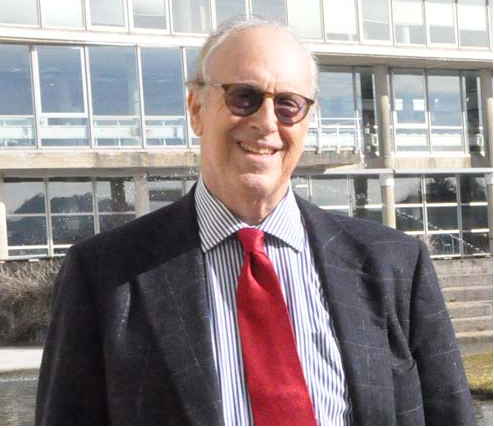
- Born: August 26, 1944 (age 82); Manchester, United Kingdom

Academic background
- Education: Oxford University, Harvard University

Academic work
- Discipline: Environmental Economics
- Institutions: Arizona State University

William Michael Hanemann (born August 26, 1944) is an economist who is a major academic contributor to the fields of environmental and resource economics. Hanemann is currently Julie A. Wrigley Professor at the School of Sustainability and Department of Economics of Arizona State University. He has been married to Mary Hanemann for more than four decades.

He received his B.A. degree in philosophy, Politics, and Economics from Oxford University in 1965 and his M.S. in Development Economics from London School of Economics in 1967. He also earned a M.A. in Public Finance and Decision Theory and a Ph.D. in economics from Harvard University in respectively 1973 and 1978.

== Career ==
Prior to his current position in Arizona, Hanemann was assistant at London School of Economics (1967–1968), teaching fellow at Harvard University (1970–1975), and between 1976 and 2011 professor of environmental and resource economics in the Department of Agricultural and Resource Economics at the University of California, Berkeley, where he still collaborates. He was also director of California Climate Change Center (2003–2006), member of the Environmental Economics Advisory Committee at US Environmental Protection Agency (2000–2006), and lead author of the IPCC Fifth Assessment Report (2011–2014).

By early 2015 Hanemann has been author of more than 70 refereed articles in journals and of more than 15 books and book chapters, being one of the most successful single environmental and resource economist in citations to journal articles. His papers consistently appear in top economics journals and he has more than 10,000 Google Scholar citations, five contributions with more than 1,000 citations and over 35 with more than 100 citations. His research focuses on environmental economics, covering diverse issues such as modeling and simulation, choice behavior, conservation, environmental regulation, economic valuation, or methodology of non-market valuation using techniques of both stated and revealed preferences. He made seminal contributions in at least three areas of environmental and resource economics: i) methods to quantify the value of environmental services not traded in markets; ii) the study of impacts of climate change in agriculture; and iii) water pricing and regulation. His intellectual contributions have also inspired many journal articles and dissertations by other authors, and he has mentored outstanding and influential scholars.

== Awards ==
Among many honors, he is a Member of the U.S. National Academy of Sciences, and a Fellow of the American Association of Agricultural Economics and the Association of Environmental and Resource Economics. In 2008 the European Association of Environmental and Resource Economists gave him the European Lifetime Achievement Award in Environmental Economics. He has also received Honorary Doctorates from the Swedish University of Agricultural Sciences in 2003 and from the University of Vigo in 2015.

== Publications ==
- "Discrete/Continuous Models of Consumer Demand" Econometrica, 52, 541–561, 1984.
- "Welfare Evaluations in Contingent Valuation Experiments with Discrete Responses" American Journal of Agricultural Economics, 66, 332–341, 1984.
- "Estimating the Value of Water Quality Improvements in a Recreational Demand Framework" Water Resources Research, 23, 951–960, 1987 (co-authors: N.E. Bockstael and C.L. Kling).
- "Time and the Recreational Demand Model" American Journal of Agricultural Economics, 69, 293–302, 1987 (co-authors: N.E. Bockstael and I.E. Strand).
- "Statistical Efficiency of Double-Bounded Dichotomous Choice Contingent Valuation" American Journal of Agricultural Economics, 73, 1255–1263, 1991 (co-authors: J. Loomis and B. Kanninen).
- "Willingness to Pay and Willingness to Accept: How Much Can They Differ?" American Economic Review, 81, 635–647, 1991.
- "A Discrete/Continuous Choice Approach to Residential Water Demand under Block Rate Pricing" Land Economics, 71, 173–192, 1995 (co-author: J.A. Hewitt).
- "The Economic Impacts of Climate Change: Evidence from Agricultural Output and Random Fluctuations in Weather: Comment" American Economic Review, 102, 3749–3760, 2012 (co-authors: A. Fisher, M. Roberts, and W. Schlenker).
- Duane Baumann; John Boland; W. Michael Hanemann (1998). Urban Water Demand Management and Planning. McGraw Hill Professional. ISBN 978-0-07-050301-4. OCLC 37353905.
