= Robert Sugden (economist) =

- Born: 26 August 1949 (age 77)

Academic background
- Education: University of York, UK
- Influences: Harsanyi, Rawls, Smith, Hume, Mill, and Hayek

Academic work
- Discipline: Microeconomics
- School or tradition: Cognitive & Behavioural Economics
- Institutions: University of East Anglia, Norwich
- Notable ideas: welfare economics, social choice, decision theory, evolutionary social theory, regret theory
- Website: Information at IDEAS / RePEc

Robert Sugden, FBA (born 26 August 1949) is an English author in the area of cognitive and behavioural economics. Professor Sugden's research combines game theory (mainly experimental game theory and coordination games) with moral and political philosophy. He is associated with the classical-liberal tradition of Hume, Mill, and Hayek.

== Theory ==
In his most cited work, Sugden explored how conventions of property, mutual aid, and voluntary supply of public goods can evolve spontaneously out of the interactions of self-interested individuals and can become moral norms.

Sugden investigated a number of violations of the von Neumann and Morgenstern's expected utility axioms, and developed regret theory as an alternative with Graham Loomes. In support of this work, he developed a number of experimental methods to test theories of decision under risk.

His work also deals with economic methods, in which he argues that economic models are not abstractions from, or simplifications of, the real world, but rather descriptions of imaginary worlds whose validity can only be inferred by how reasonable their predictions are.

In The Community of Advantage, Sugden develops a contractarian approach to welfare economics that is based on opportunity sets and not individual preferences. The shift from preferences to opportunity is partly motivated by recent experimental work indicating that individuals lack well-defined preferences. In 2019, The Community of Advantage was awarded the Joseph B. Gittler Award for outstanding contribution in the field of the philosophy of the social sciences.

== Awards and fellowships ==
- Leverhulme Personal Research Professorship, Leverhulme Trust, February 1998 – January 2003

== Selected papers ==
- G Loomes and R Sugden, Regret theory: An alternative theory of rational choice under uncertainty (1982), The Economic Journal
- R Sugden, Spontaneous order (1989), The Journal of Economic Perspectives
- R Sugden, Reciprocity: the supply of public goods through voluntary contributions (1984), The Economic Journal
- R Sugden, A theory of focal points (1995), The Economic Journal
- R Sugden, Credible worlds: the status of theoretical models in economics (2000), Journal of Economic Methodology

== Selected books ==
- R Sugden and AH Williams, The principles of practical cost-benefit analysis (1978)
- R Sugden, The economics of rights, co-operation, and welfare (1986)
- R Sugden, The community of advantage: A behavioural economist's defense of the market (2018)
