= Stability radius =

Concept in mathematics

In mathematics, the stability radius of an object (system, function, matrix, parameter) at a given nominal point is the radius of the largest ball, centered at the nominal point, all of whose elements satisfy pre-determined stability conditions. The picture of this intuitive notion is this:

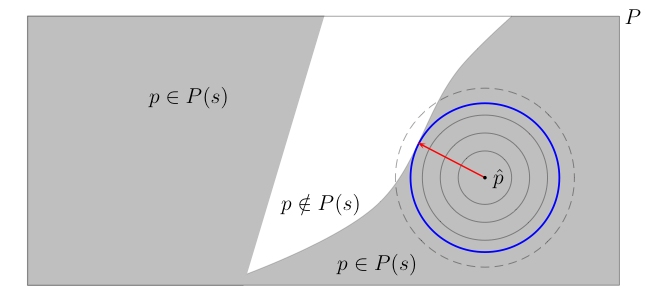

where $\hat{p}$ denotes the nominal point, $P$ denotes the space of all possible values of the object $p$, and the shaded area, $P(s)$, represents the set of points that satisfy the stability conditions. The radius of the blue circle, shown in red, is the stability radius.

== Abstract definition ==
The formal definition of this concept varies, depending on the application area. The following abstract definition is quite useful

$$\hat{\rho}(\hat{p}):= \max \ \{\rho\ge 0: p\in P(s), \forall p\in B(\rho,\hat{p})\}$$

where $B(\rho,\hat{p})$ denotes a closed ball of radius $\rho$ in $P$ centered at $\hat{p}$.

== History ==
It looks like the concept was invented in the early 1960s. In the 1980s it became popular in control theory and optimization. It is widely used as a model of local robustness against small perturbations in a given nominal value of the object of interest.

== Relation to Wald's maximin model ==
It was shown that the stability radius model is an instance of Wald's maximin model. That is,

$$\max \ \{\rho\ge 0: p\in P(s), \forall p\in B(\rho,\hat{p})\} \equiv
\max_{\rho\ge 0}\min_{p\in B(\rho,\hat{p})} f(\rho,p)$$

where

$$f(\rho,p) = \left\{\begin{array}{cc}\rho &, \ p\in P(s) \\ -\infty &,\ p\notin P(s)\end{array}\right.$$

The large penalty ($-\infty$) is a device to force the $\max$ player not to perturb the nominal value beyond the stability radius of the system. It is an indication that the stability model is a model of local stability/robustness, rather than a global one.

== Info-gap decision theory ==
Info-gap decision theory is a recent non-probabilistic decision theory. It is claimed to be radically different from all current theories of decision under uncertainty. But it has been shown that its robustness model, namely

$$\hat{\alpha}(q,\tilde{u}):= \max\ \{\alpha\ge 0: r_{c} \le R(q,u),\forall u\in U(\alpha,\tilde{u})\}$$

is actually a stability radius model characterized by a simple stability requirement of the form $r_{c}\le R(q,u)$ where $q$ denotes the decision under consideration, $u$ denotes the parameter of interest, $\tilde{u}$ denotes the estimate of the true value of $u$ and $U(\alpha,\tilde{u})$ denotes a ball of radius $\alpha$ centered at $\tilde{u}$.

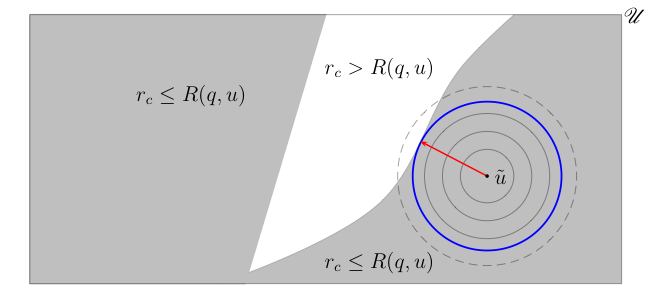

Since stability radius models are designed to deal with small perturbations in the nominal value of a parameter, info-gap's robustness model measures the local robustness of decisions in the neighborhood of the estimate $\tilde{u}$.

Sniedovich argues that for this reason the theory is unsuitable for the treatment of severe uncertainty characterized by a poor estimate and a vast uncertainty space.

== Alternate definition ==
There are cases where it is more convenient to define the stability radius slightly different. For example, in many applications in control theory the radius of stability is defined as the size of the smallest destabilizing perturbation in the nominal value of the parameter of interest. The picture is this:

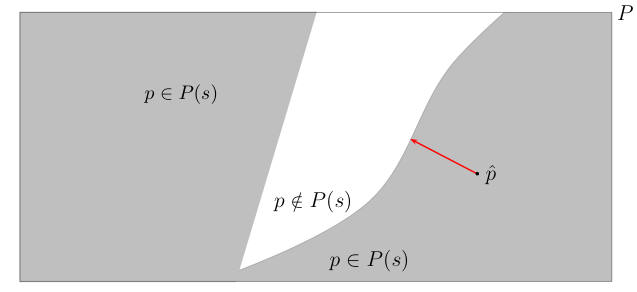

More formally,

$$\hat{\rho}(q):= \min_{p\notin P(s)}  dist(p,\hat{p})$$

where $dist(p,\hat{p})$ denotes the distance of $p\in P$ from $\hat{p}$.

== Stability radius of functions ==
The stability radius of a continuous function f (in a functional space F) with respect to an open stability domain D is the distance between f and the set of unstable functions (with respect to D). We say that a function is stable with respect to D if its spectrum is in D. Here, the notion of spectrum is defined on a case-by-case basis, as explained below.

=== Definition ===
Formally, if we denote the set of stable functions by S(D) and the stability radius by r(f,D), then:

$$r(f,D)=\inf_{g\in C}\{\|g\|:f+g\notin S(D)\},$$

where C is a subset of F.

Note that if f is already unstable (with respect to D), then r(f,D)=0 (as long as C contains zero).

=== Applications ===
The notion of stability radius is generally applied to special functions as polynomials (the spectrum is then the roots) and matrices (the spectrum is the eigenvalues). The case where C is a proper subset of F permits us to consider structured perturbations (e.g. for a matrix, we could only need perturbations on the last row). It is an interesting measure of robustness, for example in control theory.

=== Properties ===
Let f be a (complex) polynomial of degree n, C=F be the set of polynomials of degree less than (or equal to) n (which we identify here with the set $\mathbb{C}^{n+1}$ of coefficients). We take for D the open unit disk, which means we are looking for the distance between a polynomial and the set of Schur stable polynomials. Then:

$$r(f,D)=\inf_{z\in \partial D}\frac{|f(z)|}{\|q(z)\|},$$

where q contains each basis vector (e.g. $q(z)=(1,z,\ldots,z^n)$ when q is the usual power basis). This result means that the stability radius is bound with the minimal value that f reaches on the unit circle.

=== Examples ===
- The polynomial $f(z)=z^8-9/10$ (whose zeros are the 8th-roots of 0.9) has a stability radius of 1/80 if q is the power basis and the norm is the infinity norm. So there must exist a polynomial g with (infinity) norm 1/90 such that f+g has (at least) a root on the unit circle. Such a g is for example $g(z)=-1/90\sum_{i=0}^8 z^i$. Indeed, (f+g)(1)=0 and 1 is on the unit circle, which means that f+g is unstable.

== See also ==
- stable polynomial
- Wald's maximin model
