= David Pearce (economist) =

British economist (1941–2005)

David William Pearce OBE (11 October 1941 – 8 September 2005) was a pioneer of environmental economics and Professor at University College London from 1983 until 2004 when he became Emeritus.

He is known for setting out valuation techniques for natural phenomena, arguing that the environment is "under-priced" and that the benefit of environmental services may be calculated.

His early work was on cost-benefit analysis, and the economics of pollution and natural resource depletion, before these ideas entered the mainstream of the economic sciences and policymaking.

Pearce sought to influence environmental policy by engaging with the OECD, the European Commission, the World Bank, the UN and the UK government.. Among his roles were chief environmental adviser to government ministers Christopher Patten and Michael Heseltine, and convening lead author of the Intergovernmental Panel on Climate Change.

== Life and career ==
Pearce was born in Harrow, London and attended Harrow Weald county grammar school, now part of Harrow College. He graduated in Politics, Philosophy, and Economics from Lincoln College, Oxford and then studied economics at the London School of Economics. He went on to hold academic posts at the Universities of Lancaster, Southampton, Leicester, and Aberdeen before arriving at University College London as Professor of Political Economy, and later Economics. He retired in 2004.

Pearce married in 1966 and had two sons. He lived latterly in Saffron Walden, Essex.

== Publications ==
Pearce was a prolific writer: according to his cv, he authored, co-authored or edited 55 books and contributed approximately 350 articles to learned journals His publications include:-

- Pearce, David (1971). Cost Benefit Analysis. London: Macmillan.
- Pearce, David; Markandya, Anil; Barbier, Edward (1989). Blueprint for a Green Economy. London: Earthscan. ISBN 1853830666.

Works by David Pearce at IDEAS/RePEc

Works by David Pearce at Google Scholar

== Honours ==
- Global 500 Roll of Honour for Services to the World Environment by the United Nations Environment Programme (1989)
- OBE (Officer, Order of the British Empire) (2000)
- 'Lifetime Achievement Award' from the European Association of Environmental and Resource Economists (2004)
