= Richard Carson =

American economist (born 1955)

- Born: February 24, 1955 (age 71); Jackson, Mississippi
- Education: Mississippi State University; George Washington University; University of California, Berkeley
- Known for: The most cited environmental economist in the world
- Scientific career
- Fields: Economics
- Workplaces: University of California, San Diego
- Thesis: (1985)

Richard Taylor Carson (born February 24, 1955, Jackson, Mississippi) is a professor of economics at the University of California, San Diego. He obtained a B.A. degree from Mississippi State University in 1977, an M.A. in international affairs from George Washington University in 1979, and an M.A. in statistics and a Ph.D. in agricultural and resource economics from the University of California, Berkeley, in 1985. He is the author or editor of eight books and over a hundred journal articles, with over 4000 citations to his works.

== Career ==
Carson has been a consultant to a number of non-profit organizations, major corporations, and government agencies, including the Alaska Department of Fish and Game, Australian Resource Assessment Commission, California Attorney General's Office, California Department of Fish and Game, Electric Power Research Institute, Environment Canada, Interamerican Development Bank, Los Angeles Department of Water and Power, Metropolitan Water District of Southern California, National Park Service, National Oceanic and Atmospheric Administration, OECD, U.K. DEFRA, U.K. MOJ, United Nations, U.S. DOJ, U.S. EPA, and the World Bank. Carson has been a visiting professor at the University of New South Wales, University of Oslo, and the University of Sydney, a Faculty Research Fellow at the National Bureau of Economic Research and a Continuing Consultant at Resources for the Future. He served on the National Academy of Science's Committee on Oil Spill Research and Development and as a member of an academy committee reviewing procedures for water resource planning procedures. He was Program Chair for the Second World Congress of Environmental and Resource Economists.

== Selected publications ==
- "The Discrete Choice Experiment Approach to Environmental Contingent Valuation,":Carson, Richard T. and Mikolaj Czajkowski in Stephane Hess and Andrew Daly, eds. Handbook of Choice Modelling (Northampton, MA: Edward Elgar, 2014)
- "Contingent Valuation: A Practical Alternative When Prices Aren't Available,":Carson, Richard T. (Journal of Economic Perspectives, 2012)
- "A Common Nomenclature for Stated Preference Approaches,":Carson, Richard T. and Jordan J. Louviere (Environmental and Resource Economics, 2011)
- "Incentive and Information Properties of Preference Questions: Commentary and Extensions,": Carson, Richard T. and Ted Groves in Jeff Bennett, ed., International Handbook of Non-Market Environmental Valuation (Northampton, MA: Edward Elgar, 2011)
- "Discrete Choice Experiments Are Not Conjoint Analysis,": Jordan J. Louviere, Terry N. Flynn and Richard T. Carson) (Journal of Choice Modeling, 2010)
- "Incentive and Informational Properties of Preference Questions":Carson, Richard T. and Theodore Groves (Environmental and Resource Economics, 2007)
- "Contingent Valuation":Carson, Richard T. and W. Michael Hanemann (Handbook of Environmental Economics, K.G. Maler and J.R. Vincent, eds, (North Holland, 2005)
