= Super Decisions =

- Industry: Computer software
- Founder: Thomas L. Saaty and Rozann Saaty
- Key people: William J. Adams
- Website: www.creativedecisions.org

Super Decisions is decision-making software which works based on two multi-criteria decision making methods.

Super Decisions implements the Analytic Hierarchy Process (AHP) and the Analytic Network Process (ANP). It has been used in many research and practical fields such as manufacturing, environmental management, aviation, small hydropower plants and agriculture.
