= Decision Lens =

Decision Lens is online decision-making software that is based on multi-criteria decision making.

Decision Lens implements the Analytic Hierarchy Process (AHP) and the Analytic Network Process (ANP) and is used in fields such as energy, medical research and group decision-making.

The software is supplied by Decision Lens Inc., which was founded in 2002 by John and Dan Saaty.
