= Logical Decisions =

Logical Decisions is decision-making software that is based on multi-criteria decision making.

Logical Decisions implements the Multi Attribute Utility Theory (MAUT) or the Analytic Hierarchy Process (AHP) and has been used in fields such as health and environmental management.

The software is supplied by Logical Decisions Inc.
