= Ernest Forman =

American scholar

- Born: New York City, USA
- Occupations: Scholar and academic

Academic background
- Education: Bachelor of Science, Electrical Engineering; Master of Science, Management Science; Doctor of Science, Operations Research
- Alma mater: University of Rochester; Johns Hopkins University; George Washington University
- Website: https://ProfForman.com/

Ernest Forman is an American scholar and academic. He is a Professor of Decision Sciences at the George Washington University's School of Business. He is a co-founder, along with Thomas Saaty, of Expert Choice and developed the first commercial implementation of the Analytic Hierarchy Process.

Forman's work has been focused on executive decision-making, resource allocation, project portfolio management, risk analysis and risk management, operations management and statistics. He is the author of An Analytic Approach to Marketing Decisions, The Hierarchon: A Dictionary of Hierarchies, and Decision By Objectives: How To Convince Others That You Are Right.

Forman has seven patents related to decision-making and risk analysis to his name.

He is currently applying scientifically sound principles to investing in stock options and individually tailored investment portfolios.

== Education ==
Forman received his B.S. degree in Electrical Engineering from the University of Rochester in 1964. He then studied Management Science and received his M.S. degree from Johns Hopkins University in 1968 before earning his D.Sc. degree in Operations Research from the George Washington University in 1974.

== Career ==
Forman served as a Lieutenant in the United States Navy and taught mathematics and electrical engineering at the U.S. Naval Nuclear Power School. Later, he worked at the MITRE Corporation, a think tank, where he conducted seminal research for the development of the ARPA computer network, which later evolved into the Internet. Forman then joined the faculty of The George Washington University where he is a Professor of Decision Sciences.

== Research ==
Forman has worked on executive decision-making methodologies, resource allocation, project portfolio management, risk analysis and risk management, forecasting, operations management and statistics. He has also engaged in research, development and writing about the theory of measurement, corporate and public sector applications of decision analysis, strategic planning, and conflict resolution. Forman's later work involves R&D for improving risk assessment and risk management. He designed Riskion, a tool for risk assessment.

=== Decision making and Analytic Hierarchy Process ===
Forman has conducted major research in the area of decision making, focusing especially on a process called the analytic hierarchy process (AHP). His often cited article in Operations Research, "The Analytic Hierarchy Process -- An Exposition", explained important aspects of the practical applications of AHP such as when rank reversal is desirable and when it is not and how AHP has been used in a wide variety of important, complex decisions. Another often cited article "An Empirical Stopping Rule for debugging and testing computer software" was published in the Journal of the American Statistical Association.

Most recently, Forman has addressed many of the shortcomings in today's practice of risk analysis and management. The result of his work is encapsulated in the Riskion tool for risk analysis and management which enables measurement of subjective objectives as well as the relative importance of the objectives in a way that make possible scientifically valid conclusions as to how to optimally allocate an organization's resources to manage risk.

== Bibliography ==
=== Books ===
- An Analytic Approach to Marketing Decisions (1990) ISBN 978-0130352620
- The Hierarchon: A Dictionary of Hierarchies (1996) ISBN 9780962031755
- Decision By Objectives: How To Convince Others That You Are Right (2001) ISBN 9789814493949

=== Selected articles ===
- Forman, E. H., & Gass, S. I. (2001). The analytic hierarchy process—an exposition. Operations Research, 49(4), 469–486.
- Forman, E., & Peniwati, K. (1998). Aggregating individual judgments and priorities with the analytic hierarchy process. European journal of operational research, 108(1), 165–169.
- Dyer, R. F., & Forman, E. H. (1992). Group decision support with the analytic hierarchy process. Decision support systems, 8(2), 99–124.
- Dyer, R. F., Forman, E. H., & Mustafa, M. A. (1992). Decision support for media selection using the analytic hierarchy process. Journal of Advertising, 21(1), 59–72.
- Forman, E. H., & Singpurwalla, N. D. (1977). An empirical stopping rule for debugging and testing computer software. Journal of the American Statistical Association, 72(360a), 750–757.
