= Ecosystem Management Decision Support =

The Ecosystem Management Decision Support (EMDS) system is an application framework for knowledge-based decision support of ecological analysis and planning at any geographic scale.

EMDS integrates geographic information system (GIS) as well as logic programming and decision modeling technologies on multiple platforms (Windows, Linux, Mac OS X) to provide decision support for a substantial portion of the adaptive management process of ecosystem management.

EMDS has used Criterium DecisionPlus from InfoHarvest, Inc. and NetWeaver from Rules of Thumb, Inc. as core analytical engines since 2002. The NetWeaver component performs logic-based evaluation of environmental data, and logically synthesizes evaluations to infer the state of landscape features such as watersheds (e.g., watershed condition). The DecisionPlus component prioritizes landscape features with respect to user-defined management objectives (e.g., watershed restoration), using summarized outputs from NetWeaver as well as additional logistical information considered important to the decision maker(s). See the #Applications section below for a current list of published papers by application area.

Several citations provide background on the EMDS system and its potential applications.

EMDS 8.7 was released in February 2023. New features were added between v5 and 8.7 (see Frontiers in Environmental Science):

1. Classic multicriteria decision analysis to rate potential management activities in each landscape feature.
2. Design and evaluation of alternative portfolios of management actions to implement on a landscape.
3. A table and charting utility for summarizing results of the analytical engines.
4. Addition of a workflow editor to automate sequences of activities and data processing.
5. Support for scripting languages (Python, R, JavaScript, and C#script) that can be used standalone or in conjunction with the workflow editor.

== Development partners ==
EMDS was originally developed by the United States Forest Service. The Redlands Institute of the University of Redlands developed and maintained EMDS from 2005 until mid 2014 when the university closed the Redlands Institute. Support and development of EMDS was transferred to Mountain View Business Group where one of the principal programmers was able to find a new home. Development continues with support from Rules of Thumb, Inc. and InfoHarvest, Inc.. Logic Programming Associates (London, UK) joined the EMDS development group in 2013, bringing VisiRule and their expertise in Prolog programming into the mix. An area of immediate interest for further research and development based on this new expertise is the possibility for implementing natural language generators in EMDS that can interact with the analytical products and maps from NetWeaver and CDP, and render all of this complexity into easy-to-understand executive summaries. The most recent addition to the EMDS development group is BayesFusion, LLC, which brings a customized version of its SMILE engine for running GeNIe Bayesian network applications to the EMDS environment.

== Applications ==
1. EMDS, the book (March 2014).
2. Conservation
3. Ecosystems
4. Forest management
5. Landscapes
6. Pollution
7. Urban growth and development
8. Watersheds and wetlands
9. Wildlife habitat management
10. Wildland fire
