= International Symposium on the Analytic Hierarchy Process =

The International Symposium on the Analytic Hierarchy Process (ISAHP) is a biennial conference on multi-criteria decision analysis, particularly the analytic hierarchy process (AHP) and its extension the analytic network process (ANP), both developed by Thomas L. Saaty, and the combination of these with other methods. It brings together researchers, teachers and users of AHP and ANP to share their research and practical experience in making decisions incorporating these two processes.

Papers presented at ISAHP cover the major results of international research in the AHP and ANP, and provide solutions for current challenges in important areas of decision making.

The 14th ISAHP will take place in London, United Kingdom, August, 2016.

Meetings of the ISAHP
#	Year	Location	Venue	Chair	Papers
1	1988	Tianjin, China	Tianjin University	Shubo Xu	Unknown
2	1991	Pittsburgh, United States	University of Pittsburgh	Luis Vargas	Unknown
3	1994	Washington, D.C., United States	George Washington University	Ernest Forman	Unknown
4	1996	Vancouver, Canada	Simon Fraser University	William Wedley	Unknown
5	1999	Kobe, Japan	Unknown	Eizo Kinoshita	Unknown
6	2001	Bern, Switzerland	Hotel Allegro	Klaus Dellmann	57
7	2003	Nusa Dua, Indonesia	Melia Bali Hotel	Kirti Peniwati	74
8	2005	Honolulu, United States	University of Hawaii	Jason Levy	75
9	2007	Viña del Mar, Chile	Hotel del Mar	Claudio Garuti	66
10	2009	Pittsburgh	University of Pittsburgh	Thomas Saaty	85
11	2011	Sorrento, Italy	Hilton Sorrento Palace	Emilio Esposito	162
12	2013	Kuala Lumpur, Malaysia	Istana Hotel	Rafikul Islam	92
13	2014	Washington, United States	Grant Hyatt Hotel	Enrique Mu	185
14	2016	London, United Kingdom	Hilton Paddington	Leandro Pecchia	140
15	2018	Hong Kong	-	Luis Vargas	89
16	2020	Virtual	Virtual Conference	Enrique Mu	75
17	2022	Virtual	Virtual Conference	Luis Vargas	TBD
