= Expert Choice =

Decision-making software

- Industry: Computer software
- Founded: 1983; 43 years ago
- Founder: Ernest Forman
- Key people: Ernest Forman (CEO)
- Website: www.expertchoice.com

Expert Choice is decision-making software that is based on multi-criteria decision making.

Expert Choice implements the Analytic Hierarchy Process (AHP) and has been used in fields such as manufacturing, environmental management, shipbuilding and agriculture.

Created by Thomas L. Saaty and Ernest Forman in 1983, the software is supplied by Expert Choice Inc.
