= PriEsT =

- Original author: Sajid Siraj
- Final release: 20131114 / November 14, 2013; 12 years ago
- Written in: Java
- Operating system: Linux, Windows
- Type: Decision-making software
- License: GPLv3
- Website: sourceforge.net/projects/priority/

PriEsT is an acronym for 'Priority Estimation Tool' which is an open-source decision-making software that implements the Analytic Hierarchy Process (AHP) method - a comprehensive framework for decision problems. PriEsT can assist decision makers in prioritizing the options available in a given scenario.

PriEsT implements the Analytic Hierarchy Process (AHP) which has been widely used in numerous fields, such as health, transportation, telecommunication, and policy decision making. The two types of problems addressed by PriEsT are ranking problems and budgeting problems. In the ranking problems, the decision maker is interested in the order of preference for the available options. However, in budgeting, the preference weights are also required.

Due to its open source nature, the tool suits the research community as well. For example, commercial tools do not offer all the available prioritization methods and consistency measures, and usually hide the technical details of the prioritization process. By contrast, PriEsT implements several prioritization methods and consistency measures, and also provide the flexibility of adding more.

The main features of PriEsT include: supporting Pairwise comparison method with any scale for ratio-based judgements; providing widely used measures for inconsistency in judgements; offers several non-dominated solutions with the help of Evolutionary Multi-objective optimization; implements all the widely used prioritization methods for research purpose; graphical and Equalizer views for the pairwise comparison judgements; exporting problems into an XML data file; platform-independent Java-based Tool (runs on Linux, Android and Windows).

The second version of PriEsT (PriEsT v2) launched in 2013 with new features including Sensitivity analysis and support for Android-based devices.
