= Hiview3 =

Hiview3 is decision-making software that is based on multi-criteria decision making (MCDM). It employs MCDM methods based on direct rating and swing weighting and has been used in fields such as software, engineering, sanitation and health.

Hiview3 is supplied by Catalyze Ltd.
