= Decision-making software =

Type of software that helps make decisions

Decision-making software (DM software) is software for computer applications that help individuals and organisations make choices and take decisions, typically by ranking, prioritizing or choosing from a number of options.

An early example of DM software was described in 1973. Before the advent of the World Wide Web, most DM software was spreadsheet-based, with the first web-based DM software appearing in the mid-1990s. Nowadays, many DM software products (mostly web-based) are available – e.g. see the comparison table below.

Most DM software focuses on ranking, prioritizing or choosing from among alternatives characterized on multiple criteria or attributes. Thus most DM software is based on decision analysis, usually multi-criteria decision-making, and so is often referred to as "decision analysis" or "multi-criteria decision-making" software – commonly shortened to "decision-making software". Some decision support systems include a DM software component.

== Purpose ==
DM software can assist decision-makers "at various stages of the decision-making process, including problem exploration and formulation, identification of decision alternatives and solution constraints, structuring of preferences, and tradeoff judgements."

The purpose of DM software is to support the analysis involved at these various stages of the decision-making process, not to replace it. DM software "should be used to support the process, not as the driving or dominating force."

DM software frees users "from the technical implementation details [of the decision-making method employed], allowing them to focus on the fundamental value judgements". Nonetheless, DM software should not be employed blindly. "Before using a software, it is necessary to have a sound knowledge of the adopted methodology and of the decision problem at hand."

== Methods and features ==
=== Decision-making methods ===
As mentioned earlier, most DM software is based on multi-criteria decision making (MCDM). MCDM involves evaluating and combining alternatives' characteristics on two or more criteria or attributes in order to rank, prioritize or choose from among the alternatives.

There is currently a great deal of interest in quantitative methods for decision making. Many decision analysts argue for multi-attribute decision analysis as the gold standard to which other methods should be compared, based on its rigorous axiomatic basis. Some other MCDM methods include:

- Aggregated Indices Randomization Method (AIRM)
- Analytic Hierarchy Process (AHP)
- Analytic network process (ANP, an extension of AHP)
- DEX (Decision EXpert)
- Elimination and Choice Expressing Reality (ELECTRE)
- Multi-attribute global inference of quality (MAGIQ)
- Potentially All Pairwise RanKings of all possible Alternatives (PAPRIKA)
- Preference Ranking Organization Method for Enrichment Evaluation (PROMETHEE)
- Evidential reasoning approach for MCDM under hybrid uncertainty

There are significant differences between these methods and, accordingly, the DM software implementing them. Such differences include:

1. The extent to which the decision problem is broken into a hierarchy of sub-problems;
2. Whether or not pairwise comparisons of alternatives and/or criteria are used to elicit decision-makers' preferences;
3. The use of interval scale or ratio scale measurements of decision-makers' preferences;
4. The number of criteria included;
5. The number of alternatives evaluated, ranging from a few (finite) to infinite;
6. The extent to which numerical scores are used to value and/or rank alternatives;
7. The extent to which incomplete rankings (relative to complete rankings) of alternatives are produced;
8. The extent to which uncertainty is modeled and analyzed.

=== Software features ===
In the process of helping decision-makers to rank, prioritize or choose from among alternatives, DM software products often include a variety of features and tools; common examples include:

- Pairwise comparison
- Sensitivity analysis
- Group evaluation (teamwork)
- Web-based implementation

=== Comparison of decision-making software ===
DM software includes the following notable examples.

Software	Supported MCDA Methods	Pairwise Comparison	Sensitivity Analysis	Group Evaluation	Web-based	Ref.
1000minds	PAPRIKA	Yes	Yes	Yes	Yes	
Ahoona	WSM, Utility	No	No	Yes	Yes	
Altova MetaTeam	WSM	No	No	Yes	Yes	
Analytica	MAUT, SMART	No	Yes	No	Yes	
Criterium DecisionPlus	AHP, SMART	Yes	Yes	No	No	
D-Sight	PROMETHEE, UTILITY	Yes	Yes	Yes	Yes	
DecideIT	MAUT	Yes	Yes	Yes	Yes	
Decision Lens	AHP, ANP	Yes	Yes	Yes	Yes	
Expert Choice	AHP	Yes	Yes	Yes	Yes	
Hiview3	SMART	No	Yes	Yes	No	
Intelligent Decision System	Evidential Reasoning Approach, Bayesian Inference, Dempster–Shafer theory, Utility	Yes	Yes	Yes	Available on request	
Logical Decisions	AHP, MAUT, SMART	Yes	Yes	Yes	No	
PriEsT	AHP	Yes	Yes	No	No	
Super Decisions	AHP, Analytic Network Process	Yes	Yes	No	Yes	

A good summary of the capabilities of various software packages is available in the Decision Analysis Software Survey conducted by the Institute for Operations Research and the Management Sciences (INFORMS). The software packages listed in the survey range from free to commercial or enterprise-level packages.

== See also ==
- Collaborative decision-making software
- List of concept- and mind-mapping software
- Project management software
- Strategic planning software
