= 1000minds =

- Developer: 1000minds Ltd
- Initial release: 2003
- Operating system: Web application
- Available in: English
- Type: Decision-making software, Business intelligence, Conjoint analysis, Choice modelling
- License: Proprietary
- Website: www.1000minds.com

1000minds is a web application for decision-making and conjoint analysis supplied by 1000minds Ltd since 2003.

1000minds implements the PAPRIKA method to help organizations, individuals and groups to make decisions based on considering multiple objectives or criteria (i.e. multiple-criteria decision analysis). 1000minds conjoint analysis involves surveying people about their preferences with respect to the relative importance of features or attributes characterizing products or other objects of interest.

In addition, a free consumer-oriented web application based on 1000minds technology to help with 'everyday' decision-making, known as MeenyMo, was released in 2016.

== Overview ==
1000minds helps with decisions that involve ranking, prioritizing or choosing between alternatives when multiple objectives or criteria need to be considered simultaneously (i.e. multi-criteria decision making). Depending on the application, budgets or other scarce resources can also be allocated across competing alternatives in pursuit of maximum 'value for money'.

The PAPRIKA method is used to determine the relative importance of criteria or attributes and rank alternatives. Invented by Franz Ombler and Paul Hansen at the University of Otago, the PAPRIKA method is based on pairwise comparisons, as illustrated in the accompanying image.

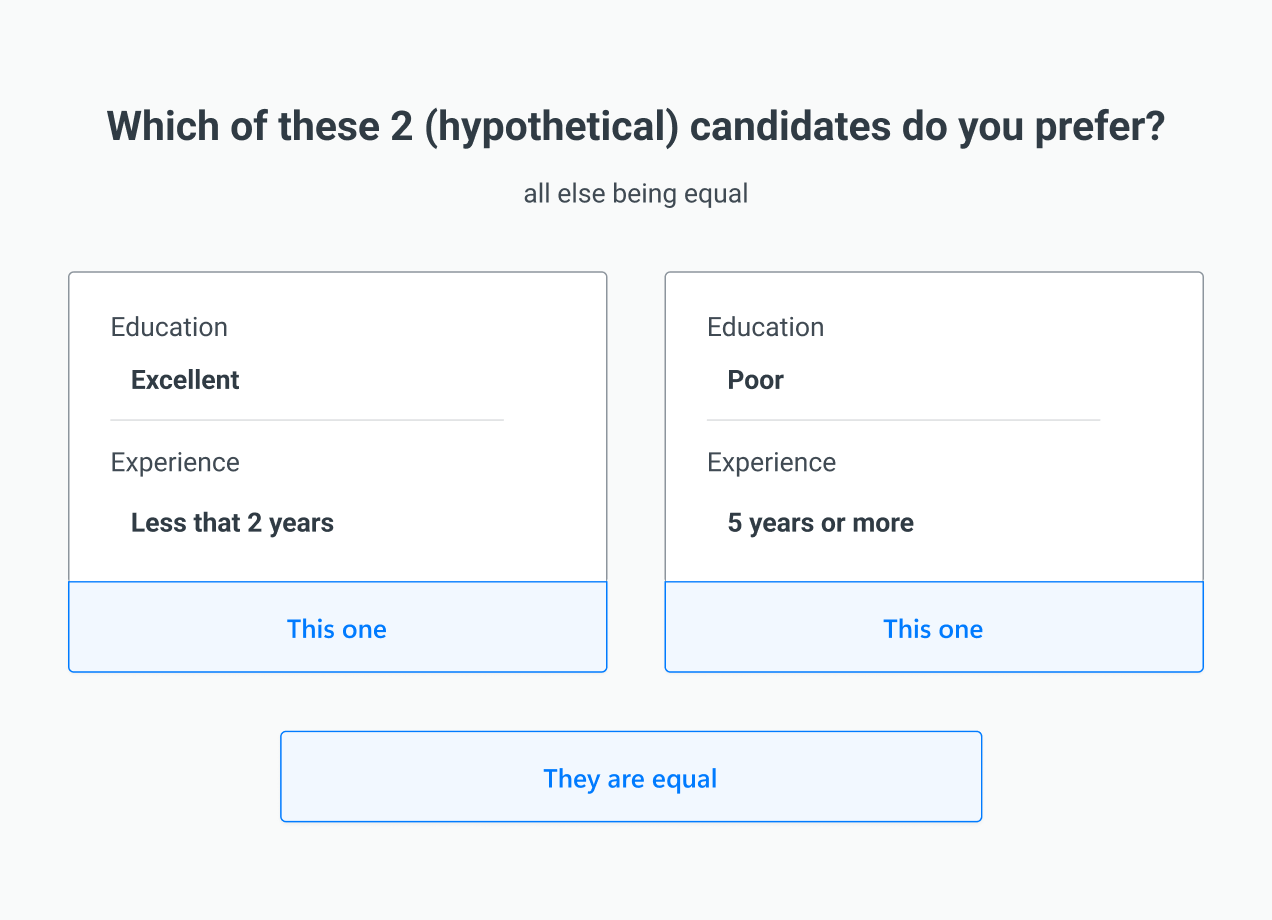
Example of a 1000minds pairwise comparison (trade-off question)

An AI assistant was added to 1000minds in 2023, implementing OpenAI’s GPT-4 technology. The AI assistant suggests criteria and examples of alternatives for the decision at hand; and then the user’s personal preferences or expert knowledge with respect to the relative importance of the criteria are elicited using PAPRIKA, resulting in the alternatives being ranked.

1000minds is also for group decision-making, involving potentially hundreds or thousands of participants – working together or individually with their results aggregated.

1000minds conjoint analysis surveys are for discovering consumers' or other stakeholders' preferences with respect to the relative importance – represented by 'part-worth utilities' or 'weights' – of the features or attributes characterizing products or other objects of interest (i.e. choice modelling, conjoint analysis and discrete choice).

== Applications ==
As well as business, government and non-profit organizations, 1000minds is used for research, as evidenced by the citations below – at over 750 universities and other research organizations worldwide, including for teaching. 1000minds (originally branded as Point Wizard) and several of its applications have won or been a finalist for a number of innovation awards.

Examples of areas in which 1000minds has been used include the following.

=== Health ===
- Prioritising patients for elective (non-urgent) surgery, rheumatology and nephrology, geriatrics and gastroenterology
- Identifying criteria for diagnosing and classifying rheumatoid arthritis, systemic sclerosis, gout, autoinflammatory disease, cryopyrin-associated periodic syndrome, dermatomyositis and polymyositis, pediatric post-thrombotic syndrome, systemic lupus erythematosus, Sjögren's syndrome and glucocorticoid toxicity
- Measuring patient responses in clinical trials for chronic gout
- Testing physical function for patients following hip or knee replacement and educating people with osteoarthritis
- Developing clinical guidelines for treatment
- Health technology prioritization
- Prioritizing antibiotic-resistant diseases for R&D

=== Environment ===
- Environmental resources management for the ocean
- Restoration of endangered plant species
- Ecology research ethics
- Sustainable agriculture

=== Urban planning and waste management ===
- Urban planning
- Waste management

=== Breeding ===
- Animal breeding
- Plant breeding

=== Policy-making research ===
- Monetary policy research
- Retirement income policies research

=== Management and accounting ===
- Corporate strategic management
- Measuring business goodwill

=== Information and communication technology (ICT) ===
- Cloud computing
- Intelligent transportation systems

=== Miscellaneous ===
- Marketing research for mobile banking and fruit juice
- Energy-efficiency decision-making
- Tourism development
- Evaluating decision-making software
- Research into charitable-giving
- Flipped classroom design
