= Criterium DecisionPlus =

Criterium DecisionPlus is decision-making software that is based on multi-criteria decision making.

The software implements the Analytic Hierarchy Process (AHP) and the Simple Multi-Attribute Rating Technique (SMART) and has been used in fields such as materials science and environmental management.

Criterium DecisionPlus is supplied by InfoHarvest Inc.
