= Ahoona =

Ahoona is a free online social network that is focused on crowd-sourcing six elements of decision quality to help people make better decisions in their daily lives. The project started through a National Science Foundation initiative known as I-Corps. It has resulted in numerous media publications, TEDx talks, TV coverage, and distribution lists of professional decision making societies. This web-based decision making project first crowd-sources the inputs to a decision and then makes a decision recommendation. The crowd-sourced elements include the bigger picture, the alternatives, the preferences, the uncertainties, the information and the pros and cons. A decision recommendation is made after the elements of decision quality are crowd-sourced using decision tree analysis, pros cons analysis or weight and rate analysis.

== Motivation ==
While the field of decision analysis has advanced significantly in the last few decades, it has not penetrated the daily lives of the general public for use with their decisions. Contributing factors to this include :

- Decision education is mainly conducted through coursework at the university level.
- Decision support software has been created for a trained analyst, who knows about decision modeling, and not a general user.
- Conducting a decision analysis requires identifying the elements of a decision such as the important alternatives, objectives, uncertainties, and the frame (or bigger picture of the decision). It has been proven that this is a cognitively difficult task when a person is facing a decision.

The main purpose of the Ahoona project is to simplify the decision making process for individuals by crowdsourcing the elements of the decision and building a step-by-step decision analysis using the crowd-sourced elements.

== History ==
The Ahoona project started in 2011 with an initiative from the National Science Foundation to operationalize research conducted at universities. The projected was found by Ali Abbas, then a professor at the University of Illinois at Urbana-Champaign together with graduate students and friends from Facebook.

== Operation ==
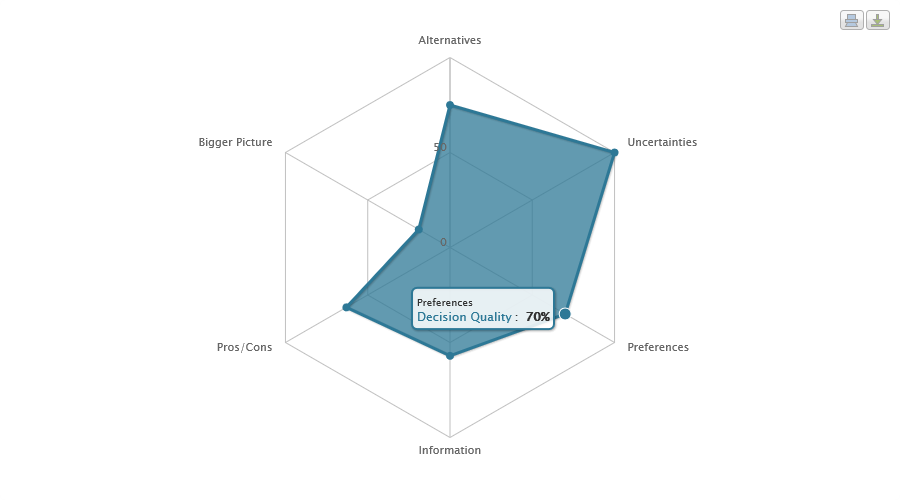
Radar chart evaluating along the six elements of decision quality

Ahoona requires users to register with their real names. Once logged in a user may post a decision he is facing to the world or to a select group of friends or to himself. Instead of receiving arbitrary recommendations, responders to the decision post, are provided with categories (buckets) for which they provide responses. These categories comprise six elements of decision quality:

1. the bigger picture,
2. the alternatives,
3. the preferences,
4. the uncertainties,
5. the information and
6. the pros and cons.

Once the inputs are received a decision tree analysis tool uses the inputs; builds a step-by-step decision tree and makes a decision recommendation.
