= Analytic network process =

Mathematical decision making technique similar to Analytic Hierarchy Process

The analytic network process (ANP) is a more general form of the analytic hierarchy process (AHP) used in multi-criteria decision analysis.

AHP structures a decision problem into a hierarchy with a goal, decision criteria, and alternatives, while the ANP structures it as a network. Both then use a system of pairwise comparisons to measure the weights of the components of the structure, and finally to rank the alternatives in the decision. ANP can be used for both best alternative selection and judgmental forecasting.

== Hierarchy vs. network ==
In the AHP, each element in the hierarchy is considered to be independent of all the others—the decision criteria are considered to be independent of one another, and the alternatives are considered to be independent of the decision criteria and of each other. But in many real-world cases, there is interdependence among the items and the alternatives. ANP does not require independence among elements, so it can be used as an effective tool in these cases.

To illustrate this, consider a simple decision about buying an automobile. The decision maker may want to decide among several moderately-priced full-size sedans. He might choose to base his decision on only three factors: purchase price, safety, and comfort. Both the AHP and ANP would provide useful frameworks to use in making his decision.

The AHP would assume that purchase price, safety, and comfort are independent of one another, and would evaluate each of the sedans independently on those criteria.

The ANP would allow consideration of the interdependence of price, safety, and comfort. If one could get more safety or comfort by paying more for the automobile (or less by paying less), the ANP could take that into account. Similarly, the ANP could allow the decision criteria to be affected by the traits of the cars under consideration. If, for example, all the cars are very, very safe, the importance of safety as a decision criterion could appropriately be reduced.

== Literature and community ==
Academic articles about ANP appear in journals dealing with the decision sciences, and several books have been written on the subject.

There are numerous practical applications of ANP, many of them involving complex decisions about benefits (B), opportunities (O), costs (C) and risks (R). Studying these applications can be very useful in understanding the complexities of the ANP. The literature contains hundreds of elaborately worked out examples of the process, developed by executives, managers, engineers, MBA and Ph.D. students and others from many countries. About a hundred such uses are illustrated and discussed in The Encyclicon, a dictionary of decisions with dependence and feedback.

Academics and practitioners meet biennially at the International Symposium on the Analytic Hierarchy Process (ISAHP), which, despite its name, devotes considerable attention to the ANP.

== The steps ==
Understanding of the ANP is best achieved by using ANP software to work with previously-completed decisions. One of the field's standard texts lists the following steps:

1. Make sure that you understand the decision problem in detail, including its objectives, criteria and subcriteria, actors and their objectives and the possible outcomes of that decision. Give details of influences that determine how that decision may come out.
2. Determine the control criteria and subcriteria in the four control hierarchies one each for the benefits, opportunities, costs and risks of that decision and obtain their priorities from paired comparison matrices. You may use the same control criteria and perhaps subcriteria for all of the four merits. If a control criterion or subcriterion has a global priority of 3% or less, you may consider carefully eliminating it from further consideration. The software automatically deals only with those criteria or subcriteria that have subnets under them. For benefits and opportunities, ask what gives the most benefits or presents the greatest opportunity to influence fulfillment of that control criterion. For costs and risks, ask what incurs the most cost or faces the greatest risk. Sometimes (very rarely), the comparisons are made simply in terms of benefits, opportunities, costs, and risks by aggregating all the criteria of each BOCR into their merit.
3. Determine a complete set of network clusters (components) and their elements that are relevant to each and every control criterion. To better organize the development of the model as well as you can, number and arrange the clusters and their elements in a convenient way (perhaps in a column). Use the identical label to represent the same cluster and the same elements for all the control criteria.
4. For each control criterion or subcriterion, determine the appropriate subset of clusters of the comprehensive set with their elements and connect them according to their outer and inner dependence influences. An arrow is drawn from a cluster to any cluster whose elements influence it.
5. Determine the approach you want to follow in the analysis of each cluster or element, influencing (the suggested approach) other clusters and elements with respect to a criterion, or being influenced by other clusters and elements. The sense (being influenced or influencing) must apply to all the criteria for the four control hierarchies for the entire decision.
6. For each control criterion, construct the supermatrix by laying out the clusters in the order they are numbered and all the elements in each cluster both vertically on the left and horizontally at the top. Enter in the appropriate position the priorities derived from the paired comparisons as subcolumns of the corresponding column of the supermatrix.
7. Perform paired comparisons on the elements within the clusters themselves according to their influence on each element in another cluster they are connected to (outer dependence) or on elements in their own cluster (inner dependence). In making comparisons, you must always have a criterion in mind. Comparisons of elements according to which element influences a third element more and how strongly more than another element it is compared with are made with a control criterion or subcriterion of the control hierarchy in mind.
8. Perform paired comparisons on the clusters as they influence each cluster to which they are connected with respect to the given control criterion. The derived weights are used to weight the elements of the corresponding column blocks of the supermatrix. Assign a zero when there is no influence. Thus obtain the weighted column stochastic supermatrix.
9. Compute the limit priorities of the stochastic supermatrix according to whether it is irreducible (primitive or imprimitive [cyclic]) or it is reducible with one being a simple or a multiple root and whether the system is cyclic or not. Two kinds of outcomes are possible. In the first, all the columns of the matrix are identical and each gives the relative priorities of the elements from which the priorities of the elements in each cluster are normalized to one. In the second, the limit cycles in blocks and the different limits are summed and averaged and again normalized to one for each cluster. Although the priority vectors are entered in the supermatrix in normalized form, the limit priorities are put in idealized form because the control criteria do not depend on the alternatives.
10. Synthesize the limiting priorities by weighting each idealized limit vector by the weight of its control criterion and adding the resulting vectors for each of the four merits: Benefits (B), Opportunities (O), Costs (C) and Risks (R). There are now four vectors, one for each of the four merits. An answer involving ratio values of the merits is obtained by forming the ratio B_{i}O_{i} / C_{i}R_{i} for alternative i from each of the four vectors. The synthesized ideals for all the control criteria under each merit may result in an ideal whose priority is less than one for that merit. Only an alternative that is ideal for all the control criteria under a merit receives the value one after synthesis for that merit. The alternative with the largest ratio is chosen for some decisions. Companies and individuals with limited resources often prefer this type of synthesis.
11. Determine strategic criteria and their priorities to rate the top ranked (ideal) alternative for each of the four merits one at a time. Normalize the four ratings thus obtained and use them to calculate the overall synthesis of the four vectors. For each alternative, subtract the sum of the weighted costs and risks from the sum of the weighted benefits and opportunities.
12. Perform sensitivity analysis on the final outcome. Sensitivity analysis is concerned with "what if" kinds of questions to see if the final answer is stable to changes in the inputs, whether judgments or priorities. Of special interest is to see if these changes change the order of the alternatives. How significant the change is can be measured with the Compatibility Index of the original outcome and each new outcome.

== See also ==
- Analytic hierarchy process
- Decision making
- Decision making software
- L. L. Thurstone
- Law of comparative judgment
- Multi-criteria decision analysis
- Ordinal Priority Approach
- Pairwise comparison
- Preference
- Thomas L. Saaty
