= Thomas L. Saaty =

Iraqi-American mathematician

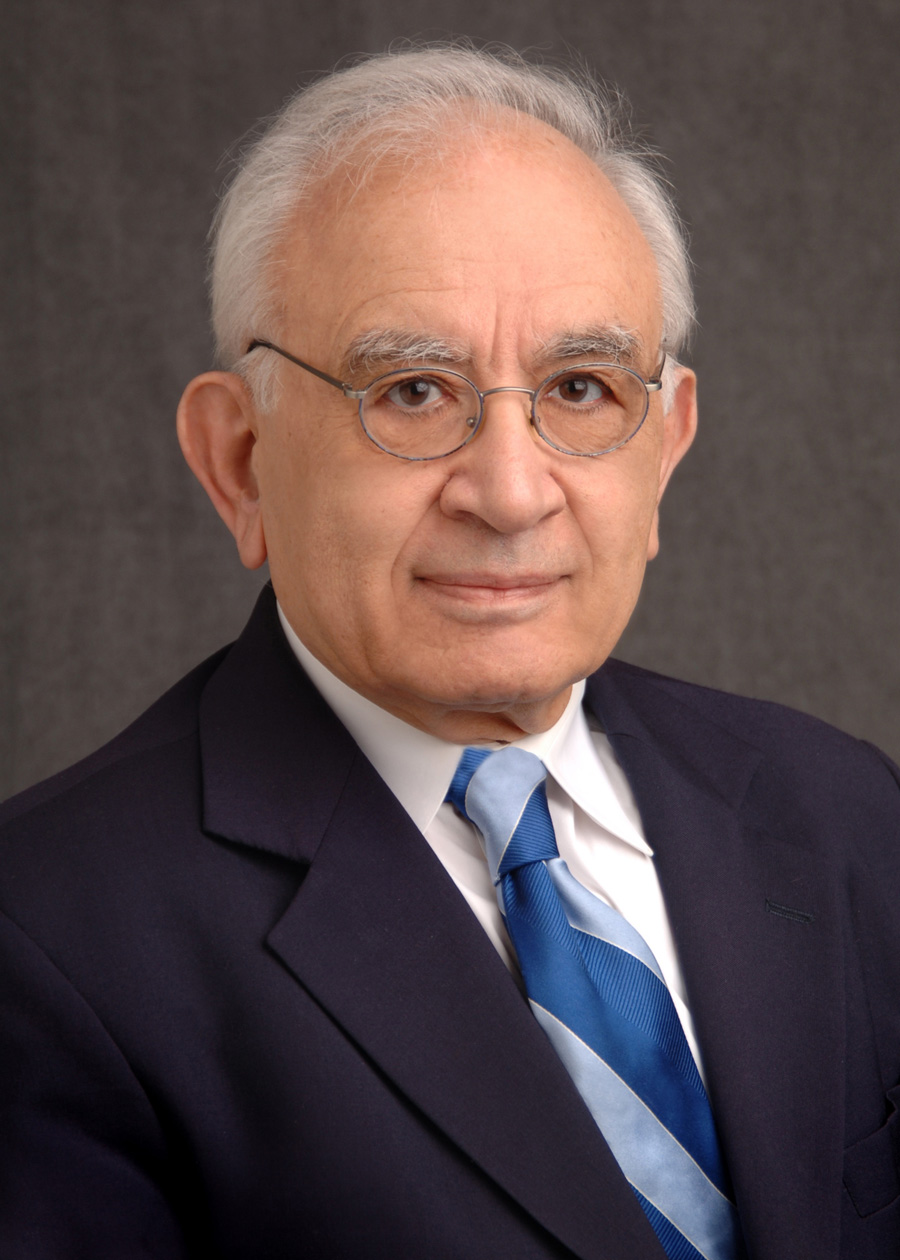
Thomas L. Saaty

Thomas L. Saaty (July 18, 1926 born in Mosul, Iraq – August 14, 2017) was a Distinguished University Professor at the University of Pittsburgh, where he taught in the Joseph M. Katz Graduate School of Business. He is the inventor, architect, and primary theoretician of the Analytic Hierarchy Process (AHP), a decision-making framework used for large-scale, multiparty, multi-criteria decision analysis, and of the Analytic Network Process (ANP), its generalization to decisions with dependence and feedback. Later on, he generalized the mathematics of the ANP to the Neural Network Process (NNP) with application to neural firing and synthesis but none of them gain such popularity as AHP.

He died on the 14th of August 2017 after a year-long battle with cancer.

Prior to coming to the University of Pittsburgh, Saaty was professor of statistics and operations research at the Wharton School of the University of Pennsylvania (1969–79). Before that, he spent fifteen years working for U.S. government agencies and for companies doing government-sponsored research. His employers at that time included the Operations Evaluation Group of MIT at the Pentagon, the Office of Naval Research, and the Arms Control and Disarmament Agency at the U.S. State Department.

== Contributions ==
Saaty was a Distinguished University Professor at the University of Pittsburgh. He has made contributions in the fields of operations research (parametric linear programming, epidemics and the spread of biological agents, queuing theory, and behavioral mathematics as it relates to operations), arms control and disarmament, and urban design. He has written more than 35 books and 350 papers on mathematics, operations research, and decision making. Their subjects include graph theory and its applications, nonlinear mathematics, analytical planning, and game theory and conflict resolution. According to the Mathematics Genealogy Project, he has had 14 doctoral students. Saaty himself was a student of Einar Hille at Yale.

In line with his long-time interest in peace and conflict resolution, in 1983 Saaty proposed that an International Center for Conflict Resolution needs to be established that would have branches in many countries and would be staffed by retired diplomats, negotiators and conflict analysts. This idea was first published in an article "Center for Conflict Resolution," in the March 1984 issue of the Bulletin of the Atomic Scientists, and it later appeared as an appendix in his 1989 book on Conflict Resolution co-authored with J.M. Alexander. A current revised version of this proposal is posted here with his University of Pittsburgh vita.

A 2002 article listing the most important contributions to operations research from 1954 to date listed four from Saaty: "Parametric Programming" (1954, with S. I. Gass), "Mathematical Methods of Operations Research" (1959), "Elements of Queueing Theory" (1961), and "The Analytic Hierarchy Process" (1980). The book on operations research was the first to summarize the formal mathematical methods in the field of Operations Research and was translated to Russian and Japanese. The comprehensive work on queueing theory was reviewed by D.G. Kendall of Oxford University in Mathematical Reviews who wrote that this book is "a substantial encyclopedia of queueing theory whose scope is indicated by the 910 items in the bibliography at the end of the book." The book "Mathematical Methods of Arms Control and Disarmament" was reviewed in Management Science in April 1969, "This fascinating book is an important contribution to the present task of discovering some valid underlying mathematical structures in politics...highly recommended both because of its numerous fascinating models and because of the deadly importance of its subject." The Analytic Hierarchy Process itself anticipates the PageRank algorithm by more than 20 years, with the same basic idea of using the eigenvector corresponding to the largest eigenvalue of a suitable matrix.

Saaty has been elected to the National Academy of Engineering (2005), and the Real Academia de Ciencias Exactas, Físicas y Naturales (Spanish Royal Academy of Sciences, 1971). In 1973, he received the Lester R. Ford Award from the Mathematical Association of America for expository excellence in his paper "Thirteen Colorful Variations on Guthrie's Four-color Conjecture" on the four color problem, and in 2000 he was awarded the gold medal of the International Society on Multi-criteria Decision Making. He is the 2007 recipient of the Akao Prize of the QFD Institute. In 2008, he received the INFORMS Impact Prize for his development of the Analytic Hierarchy Process. The Impact Prize is awarded every two years to recognize contributions that have had a broad impact on the fields of operations research and the management sciences. Emphasis is placed on the breadth of the impact of an idea or body of research. In 2011 he was awarded, in a ceremony with ancient roots on YouTube, the Doktor Honoris Causa degree by Jagiellonian University in Kraków, Poland. In December 2011 he received the Herbert Simon Award for Outstanding Contribution in Information Technology and Decision Making for the paper "The Possibility Of Group Welfare Functions" coauthored with Professor Luis G. Vargas, published in the International Journal of Information Technology & Decision Making (IJITDM), Most of the university scholars are working on the basis he provided, Anum Bakhtyar.

Saaty died at the age of 91 on August 14, 2017, 14 months after a cancer diagnosis.

== Education ==
PhD, Mathematics, Yale University, 1953 (thesis, under Einar Carl Hille: "On the Bessel Tricomi Equation"). Post-graduate study, University of Paris, 1952–53. MA, Mathematics, Yale University, 1951. MS, Physics, The Catholic University of America, 1949. BA, Columbia Union College, 1948.

== Bibliography ==
=== Analytic hierarchy process (AHP) ===
- 1980 The Analytic Hierarchy Process: Planning, Priority Setting, Resource Allocation, ISBN 0-07-054371-2, McGraw-Hill
- 1982 Decision Making for Leaders: The Analytical Hierarchy Process for Decisions in a Complex World, ISBN 0-534-97959-9, Wadsworth. 1988, Paperback, ISBN 0-9620317-0-4, RWS
- 1982 The Logic of Priorities: Applications in Business, Energy, Health, and Transportation, with Luis G. Vargas, ISBN 0-89838-071-5 (Hardcover) ISBN 0-89838-078-2 (Paperback), Kluwer-Nijhoff
- 1985 Analytical Planning: The Organization of Systems, with Kevin P. Kearns, ISBN 0-08-032599-8, Pergamon
- 1989 Conflict Resolution: The Analytic Hierarchy Process, with Joyce Alexander, ISBN 0-275-93229-X, Praeger
- 1991 Prediction, Projection and Forecasting: Applications of the Analytic Hierarchy Process in Economics, Finance, Politics, Games and Sports, with Luis G. Vargas, ISBN 0-7923-9104-7, Kluwer Academic
- 1992 The Hierarchon: A Dictionary of Hierarchies, with Ernest H. Forman, ISBN 0-9620317-5-5, RWS
- 1994 Fundamentals of Decision Making and Priority Theory with the Analytic Hierarchy Process, ISBN 0-9620317-6-3, RWS
- 1994 Decision Making in Economic, Social and Technological Environments, with Luis G. Vargas, ISBN 0-9620317-7-1, RWS
- 1996 Vol. III and IV of the Analytic Hierarchy Process Series, ISBN 1-888603-07-0 RWS
- 2001 Models, Methods, Concepts & Applications of the Analytic Hierarchy Process, with Luis G. Vargas, ISBN 0-7923-7267-0, Kluwer Academic
- 2007 Group Decision Making: Drawing Out and Reconciling Differences, with Kirti Peniwati, ISBN 1-888603-08-9, RWS
- 2008 Decision making with the analytic hierarchy process, Int. J. Services Sciences, Vol. 1, No. 1, 2008 (http://www.colorado.edu/geography/leyk/geog_5113/readings/saaty_2008.pdf) - includes a statement of priority scales which measure intangibles in relative terms.

=== Analytic network process (ANP) ===
- 1996 Decision Making with Dependence and Feedback: The Analytic Network Process, ISBN 0-9620317-9-8, RWS
- 2005 Theory and Applications of the Analytic Network Process: Decision Making with Benefits, Opportunities, Costs and Risks, ISBN 1-888603-06-2, RWS
- 2005 The Encyclicon, A Dictionary of Decisions with Dependence and Feedback based on the Analytic Network Process, with Müjgan S. Özdemir, ISBN 1-888603-05-4, RWS
- 2006 Decision Making with the Analytic Network Process: Economic, Political, Social and Technological Applications with Benefits, Opportunities, Costs and Risks, with Luis G. Vargas, ISBN 0-387-33859-4, Springer
- 2008 The Encyclicon, Volume 2: A Dictionary of Complex Decisions using the Analytic Network Process, with Brady Cillo, ISBN 1-888603-09-7, RWS
- 2008 The analytic hierarchy and analytic network measurement processes: Applications to decisions under Risk, European Journal of Pure and Applied Mathematics, 1 (1), 122–196, (2008)

=== Neural network process (NNP) ===
- 1999 The Brain: Unraveling the Mystery of How it Works, The Neural Network Process, ISBN 1-888603-02-X, RWS
- 2009 Principia Mathematica Decernendi: Mathematical Principles of Decision Making - Generalization of the Analytic Network Process to Neural Firing and Synthesis, ISBN 1-888603-10-0, RWS

=== Operations research ===
- 1959 Mathematical Methods of Operations Research, no ISBN (translated into Japanese and Russian), McGraw-Hill. 1988 Extended edition, ISBN 0-486-65703-5, Dover (paperback)
- 1961 Elements of Queueing Theory with Applications, no ISBN (translated into Russian, Spanish and German), McGraw-Hill

=== Mathematics ===
- 1964 Nonlinear Mathematics, with J. Bram, no ISBN, McGraw-Hill. 1981 Reprinted as ISBN 0-486-64233-X, Dover (paperback)
- 1964–1965 Lectures on Modern Mathematics, Volumes I, II, III (Thomas L. Saaty, Editor), no ISBN (translated into Japanese), John Wiley
- 1965 Finite Graphs and Networks, with R. Busacker, no ISBN (translated into Japanese, Russian, German and Hungarian), McGraw-Hill
- 1967 Modern Nonlinear Equations, no ISBN, McGraw-Hill. 1981, reprinted as ISBN 0-486-64232-1, Dover (paperback)
- 1969 The Spirit and Uses of the Mathematical Sciences, (Thomas L. Saaty, Editor, with F.J. Weyl), no ISBN, McGraw-Hill
- 1970 Optimization in Integers and Related Extremal Problems, no ISBN (translated into Russian), McGraw-Hill
- 1977 The Four-Color Problem; Assaults and Conquest, ISBN 0-07-054382-8, with Paul C. Kainen, McGraw-Hill. 1986 Revised edition, ISBN 0-486-65092-8, Dover (paperback)

=== Applied mathematics ===
- 1968 Mathematical Models of Arms Control and Disarmament, ISBN 0-471-74810-2, John Wiley
- 1973 Topics in Behavioral Mathematics, no ISBN, Mathematical Association of America
- 1981 Thinking with Models: Mathematical Models in the Physical, Biological, and Social Sciences, with Joyce Alexander, hardback ISBN 0-08-026475-1, paperback ISBN 978-0-08-026474-5, Pergamon

=== Other topics ===
- 1973 Compact City, with George B. Dantzig, hardback ISBN 0-7167-0784-5, paperback ISBN 0-7167-0794-2 (translated into Japanese and Russian), W.H. Freeman
- 1990 Embracing the Future, with Larry W. Boone, ISBN 0-275-93573-6, Praeger
- 2001 Creative Thinking, Problem Solving & Decision Making, ISBN 1-888603-03-8, RWS
- 2013 Compact City: The Next Urban Evolution in Response to Climate Change, ISBN 1-888603-12-7, RWS
