= Decision-making paradox =

The decision-making paradox is a phenomenon related to decision-making and the quest for determining reliable decision-making methods. It was first described by Triantaphyllou, and has been recognized in the related literature as a fundamental paradox in multi-criteria decision analysis (MCDA), multi-criteria decision making (MCDM) and decision analysis since then.

== Description ==
The decision-making paradox was first described in 1989, and further elaborated in the 2000 book by Triantaphyllou on multi-criteria decision analysis (MCDA) / multi-criteria decision making (MCDM). It arises from the observation that different decision-making methods, both normative and descriptive, yield different results, when fed with exactly the same decision problem and data. It has been recognized in the related literature as a fundamental paradox in multi-criteria decision analysis (MCDA) / multi-criteria decision making (MCDM), and decision analysis since then.

In a study reported in International Journal of Decision Support Systems and Multi-Criteria Decision Making: A Comparative Study, the following investigation was undertaken. Since in the beginning it was assumed that the best method is not known, the problem of selecting the best method was solved by successively using different methods. The methods used in that study were the weighted sum model (WSM), the weighted product model (WPM), and two variants of the analytic hierarchy process (AHP). It was found that when a method was used, say method X (which is one of the previous four methods), the conclusion was that another method was best (say, method Y). When method Y was used, then another method, say method Z, was suggested as being the best one, and so on.

Two evaluative criteria were used to formulate the previous decision-making problem, which is actually an MCDM problem. The first criterion was based on the premise that a method which claims to be accurate in multi-dimensional problems (for which different units of measurement are used to describe the alternatives), should also be accurate in single-dimensional problems. For such problems, the weighted sum model (WSM) is the widely accepted approach, thus, their results were compared with the ones derived from the WSM. The second evaluative criterion was based on the situation: alternative A, is evaluated as the best alternative, compared to the non-optimal alternative B. If B is replaced by a worse one, one should expect that alternative A remains the best alternative, under normal conditions where the weights of the two evaluative criteria in all possible combinations always add equal to 1. If not it is known as a ranking reversal.

== Methods affected ==
The following multi-criteria decision-making methods have been confirmed to exhibit this paradox:The analytic hierarchy process (AHP) and some of its variants, the weighted product model (WPM), the ELECTRE (outranking) method and its variants and the TOPSIS method.

== Other methods ==
Other methods that have not been tested yet but may exhibit the same phenomenon include the following:

- The analytic network process (ANP).
- The PROMETHEE (outranking) method.
- Ordinal Priority Approach (OPA)
- Multi-attribute utility theory (MAUT).
- Dominance-based rough set approach (DRSA)
- Aggregated indices randomization method (AIRM)
- Nonstructural fuzzy decision support system (NSFDSS)
- Grey relational analysis (GRA)
- Superiority and inferiority ranking method (SIR method)
- Potentially all pairwise rankings of all possible alternatives (PAPRIKA)
- Value analysis (VA)

A key role in this quest is played by the study of rank reversals in decision making.
