= VIKOR method =

Decision-making strategy

The VIKOR method is a multi-criteria decision making (MCDM) method. It was originally developed by Serafim Opricović in 1979 to solve decision problems with conflicting and noncommensurable (different units) criteria. It assumes that compromise is acceptable for conflict resolution and that the decision maker wants a solution that is the closest to the ideal, so the alternatives are evaluated according to all established criteria. VIKOR then ranks alternatives and determines the solution named compromise that is the closest to the ideal.

== History ==
The idea of compromise solution was introduced in MCDM by Po-Lung Yu in 1973, and by Milan Zeleny.

Opricović had developed the basic ideas of VIKOR in his Ph.D. dissertation in 1979, and an application was published in 1980. The name VIKOR appeared in 1990 from Serbian: VIšeKriterijumska Optimizacija I Kompromisno Rešenje 'Multicriteria Optimization and Compromise Solution'. The real applications were presented in 1998. The paper in 2004 contributed to the international recognition of the VIKOR method. (The most cited paper in the field of Economics, Science Watch, Apr.2009).

== Statement ==
The MCDM problem is stated as follows: Determine the best (compromise) solution in multicriteria sense from the set of J feasible alternatives $A_1, A_2, \dots, A_J$, evaluated according to the set of n criterion functions. The input data are the elements $F_{ij}$ of the performance (decision) matrix, where $F_{ij}$ is the value of the i-th criterion function for the alternative $A_j$.

== VIKOR method steps ==
The VIKOR procedure has the following steps:

Step 1. Determine the best fi* and the worst fi^ values of all criterion functions, i = 1,2,...,n; fi* = max (fij,j=1,...,J), fi^ = min (fij,j=1,...,J), if the i-th function is benefit; fi* = min (fij,j=1,...,J), fi^ = max (fij,j=1,...,J), if the i-th function is cost.

Step 2. Compute the values Sj and Rj, j=1,2,...,J, by the relations: Sj=sum[wi(fi* - fij)/(fi*-fi^),i=1,...,n], weighted and normalized Manhattan distance; Rj=max[wi(fi* - fij)/(fi*-fi^),i=1,...,n], weighted and normalized Chebyshev distance; where wi are the weights of criteria, expressing the DM's preference as the relative importance of the criteria.

Step 3. Compute the values Qj, j=1,2,...,J, by the relation Qj = v(Sj – S*)/(S^ - S*) + (1-v)(Rj-R*)/(R^-R*) where S* = min (Sj, j=1,...,J), S^ = max (Sj, j=1,...,J), R* = min (Rj, j=1,...,J), R^ = max (Rj, j=1,...,J),; and is introduced as a weight for the strategy of maximum group utility, whereas 1-v is the weight of the individual regret. These strategies could be compromised by v = 0.5, and here v is modified as = (n + 1)/ 2n (from v + 0.5(n-1)/n = 1) since the criterion (1 of n) related to R is included in S, too.

Step 4. Rank the alternatives, sorting by the values S, R and Q, from the minimum value. The results are three ranking lists.

Step 5. Propose as a compromise solution the alternative A(1) which is the best ranked by the measure Q (minimum) if the following two conditions are satisfied: C1. “Acceptable Advantage”: Q(A(2) – Q(A(1)) >= DQ where: A(2) is the alternative with second position in the ranking list by Q; DQ = 1/(J-1). C2. “Acceptable Stability in decision making”: The alternative A(1) must also be the best ranked by S or/and R. This compromise solution is stable within a decision making process, which could be the strategy of maximum group utility (when v > 0.5 is needed), or “by consensus” v about 0.5, or “with veto” v < 0.5). If one of the conditions is not satisfied, then a set of compromise solutions is proposed, which consists of: - Alternatives A(1) and A(2) if only the condition C2 is not satisfied, or - Alternatives A(1), A(2),..., A(M) if the condition C1 is not satisfied; A(M) is determined by the relation Q(A(M)) – Q(A(1)) < DQ for maximum M (the positions of these alternatives are “in closeness”).

The obtained compromise solution could be accepted by the decision makers because it provides a maximum utility of the majority (represented by min S), and a minimum individual regret of the opponent (represented by min R). The measures S and R are integrated into Q for compromise solution, the base for an agreement established by mutual concessions.

== Comparative analysis ==
A comparative analysis of MCDM methods VIKOR, TOPSIS, ELECTRE and PROMETHEE is presented in the paper in 2007, through the discussion of their distinctive features and their application results. Sayadi et al. extended the VIKOR method for decision making with interval data. Heydari et al. extended this method for solving Multiple Objective Large-Scale Nonlinear Programming problems.

== Fuzzy VIKOR method ==
The Fuzzy VIKOR method has been developed to solve problem in a fuzzy environment where both criteria and weights could be fuzzy sets. The triangular fuzzy numbers are used to handle imprecise numerical quantities. Fuzzy VIKOR is based on the aggregating fuzzy merit that represents distance of an alternative to the ideal solution. The fuzzy operations and procedures for ranking fuzzy numbers are used in developing the fuzzy VIKOR algorithm.

== See also ==
- Rank reversals in decision-making
- Multi-criteria decision analysis
- Ordinal Priority Approach
- Pairwise comparison
