= BWM =

BWM or bwm may refer to:

- Best worst method, a multi-criteria decision-making method
- BWM, the DS100 code for Berlin-Wilhelmsruh station, Berlin, Germany
- BWM, the IATA code for Bowman Municipal Airport, North Dakota, United States
- BWM, the Indian Railways station code for Bhawani Mandi railway station, Rajasthan, India
- bwm, the ISO 639-3 code for Mundugumor language, Papua New Guinea
