= Superiority and inferiority ranking method =

The superiority and inferiority ranking method (or SIR method) is a multi-criteria decision making model (MCDA) which can handle real data and provides six different preference structures for the system user. MCDM is a sub-discipline of operations research that explicitly evaluates multiple conflicting criteria in decision making, both in daily life and in settings such as business, government and medicine.

== Description ==
It also incorporates outranking rationale to deal with the 'poor' true-criteria preference structure which appears in selecting proper equipment. The superiority and inferiority scores are produced through the generalized criteria. The SIR method can also analyze different criteria without compiling them into a small scale as GAs.

== See also ==
- Architecture tradeoff analysis method
- Decision-making
- Decision-making software
- Decision-making paradox
- Decisional balance sheet
- Multicriteria classification problems
- Probability distribution
- Rank reversals in decision-making

== Sources ==
- Tam CM, Tong TKL, Wong YW, (2004), Selection of Concrete Pump Using the Superiority and Inferiority Ranking Method, Journal of Construction Engineering and Management, Volume 130, Issue 6, pp. 827–834 (November/December)
- Free Multi-criteria Decision Aiding (MCDA) Tools for Research Students http://sites.google.com/site/mcdafreeware/
