= D-Sight =

- Company type: Private
- Industry: Enterprise software
- Founded: 2010
- Headquarters: Brussels, Belgium
- Products: D-Sight Portfolio, D-Sight Sourcing, D-Sight CDM
- Website: www.d-sight.com

D-Sight is a company that specializes in decision support software and associated services in the domains of project prioritization, supplier selection and collaborative decision-making. It was founded in 2010 as a spin-off from the Université Libre de Bruxelles (ULB). Their headquarters are located in Brussels, Belgium.

== Software products ==
D-Sight has developed different software products that all aim at supporting different complex decision-making processes. All products are distributed under the model of software as a service. The products are used in a wide variety of industries such as energy and natural resources, chemical and pharmaceutical, NGO and public, etc.

=== D-Sight Portfolio ===
D-Sight Portfolio is a Project Portfolio Management (PPM) platform focused around the early stage decision-making. It allows users to:

- Collect and centralize data for project requests and build the business case
- Prioritize project proposals and evaluate the ranking
- Allocate resources to those proposals that add the most value to the organization, thereby optimizing the project portfolio

=== D-Sight Sourcing ===
D-Sight Sourcing is a strategic sourcing platform to standardize and justify the supplier selection process.

=== D-Sight CDM ===
D-Sight Collaborative Decision-Making (CDM) is a decision-making software that offers a structured approach to data-based group decisions.

== Methodology ==
The methodology used in these platforms is a multi-criteria decision analysis (MCDA). Rather than looking at one single determinant to make decisions, MCDA methods consider multiple factors. They integrate both quantitative and qualitative information, and allow to make informed rather than purely intuitive decisions.

D-Sight's software products implement more specifically the Preference Ranking Organization Method for Enrichment Evaluation (PROMETHEE) and geometrical analysis for interactive decision aid (GAIA), multi-attribute utility theory (MAUT) and analytic hierarchy process (AHP).
