= DRSA =

DRSA may refer to:

- Dominance-based rough set approach (theoretical computer science)
- Deutsches Rettungsschwimmabzeichen (the German water-lifesaving grade)
