= Brown–Gibson model =

The Brown–Gibson model is one of the many techniques for multi-attribute decision making. The method was developed in 1972 by P. Brown and D. Gibson. This is one of the few models which integrates both objective and subjective factors in decision making.

The Brown–Gibson model can be mathematically represented as follows:

$$M_i = C_i \cdot \big[ D \cdot O_i + (1 - D) S_i \big]$$

where

M_{i} = measure for an alternative i

C_{i} = critical factor measure, which could be either 0 or 1 for an alternative i

O = objective factor measure, which could be between 0 and 1; however, the sum of all objective factor measures for different alternatives should add back to 1

S = subjective factor measure, which could be between 0 and 1; however, the sum of all subjective factor measures for different alternatives should add back to 1

D = objective factor decision weight; should be between 0 and 1

One would select the alternative whose measure is the highest.

== See also ==
- Analytic hierarchy process (AHP)
- Ordinal Priority Approach (OPA)
