= Proaftn =

Proaftn is a fuzzy classification method that belongs to the class of supervised learning algorithms. The acronym Proaftn stands for: (PROcédure d'Affectation Floue pour la problématique du Tri Nominal), which means in English: Fuzzy Assignment Procedure for Nominal Sorting.

The method enables to determine the fuzzy indifference relations by generalizing the indices (concordance and discordance) used in the ELECTRE III method. To determine the fuzzy indifference relations, PROAFTN uses the general scheme of the discretization technique described in, that establishes a set of pre-classified cases called a training set.

To resolve the classification problems, Proaftn proceeds by the following stages:

Stage 1. Modeling of classes: In this stage, the prototypes of the classes are conceived using the two following steps:

- Step 1. Structuring: The prototypes and their parameters (thresholds, weights, etc.) are established using the available knowledge given by the expert.
- Step 2. Validation: We use one of the two following techniques in order to validate or adjust the parameters obtained in the first step through the assignment examples known as a training set.

Direct technique: It consists in adjusting the parameters through the training set and with the expert intervention.

Indirect technique: It consists in fitting the parameters without the expert intervention as used in machine learning approaches.

In multicriteria classification problem, the indirect technique is known as preference disaggregation analysis. This technique requires less cognitive effort than the former technique; it uses an automatic method to determine the optimal parameters, which minimize the classification errors.

Furthermore, several heuristics and metaheuristics were used to learn the multicriteria classification method Proaftn.

Stage 2. Assignment: After conceiving the prototypes, Proaftn proceeds to assign the new objects to specific classes.
