= Bernard Roy =

French mathematician

Bernard Roy (French pronunciation: [bɛʁnaʁ ʁwa]; 15 March 1934 – 28 October 2017) was an emeritus professor at the Université Paris-Dauphine. In 1974 he founded the "Laboratoire d'Analyse et de Modélisation des Systèmes pour l'Aide à la Décision" (Lamsade). He was President of Association of European Operational Research Societies from 1985 to 1986. In 1992 he was awarded the EURO Gold Medal, the highest distinction within Operations Research in Europe. In 2015 he received the EURO Distinguished Service Award.

He worked on graph theory and on multi-criteria decision analysis (MCDA), having created the ELECTRE family of methods. The name ELECTRE stands for "ELimination Et Choix Traduisant la REalité".
