= Belief structure =

A belief structure is a distributed assessment with beliefs.

== Evidential reasoning ==
A belief structure is used in the evidential reasoning (ER) approach for multiple-criteria decision analysis (MCDA) to represent the performance of an alternative option on a criterion.

In the ER approach, an MCDA problem is modelled by a belief decision matrix instead of a conventional decision matrix. The difference between the two is that, in the former, each element is a belief structure; in the latter, conversely, each element is a single value (either numerical or textual).

=== Application ===
For example, the quality of a car engine may be assessed to be “excellent” with a high degree of belief (e.g. 0.6) due to its low fuel consumption, low vibration and high responsiveness. At the same time, the quality may be assessed to be only “good” with a lower degree of belief (e.g. 0.4 or less) because its quietness and starting can still be improved. Such an assessment can be modeled by a belief structure: Si(engine)={(excellent, 0.6), (good, 0.4)}, where Si stands for the assessment of engine on the ith criterion (quality). In the belief structure, “excellent” and “good” are assessment standards, whilst “0.6” and “0.4” are degrees of belief.
