= Weighted product model =

The weighted product model (WPM) is a multi-criteria decision analysis (MCDA) method used in operations research and decision theory for evaluating and ranking alternatives based on multiple conflicting criteria.

The method calculates a score for each alternative by multiplying together all the criteria values, where each value is raised to a power that reflects the importance (weight) of that criterion. This multiplicative approach distinguishes it from additive methods like the weighted sum model (WSM), providing the crucial advantage of dimensional consistency—effectively resolving the problem of "adding apples and oranges" that occurs when combining measurements expressed in different units.

Unlike the weighted sum model, which requires extensive data normalization procedures that can significantly influence final rankings, the WPM's multiplicative structure eliminates the need for normalization entirely. This characteristic makes it particularly robust for applications involving heterogeneous data sets and reduces the potential for bias introduced through normalization choices. The method has found widespread application in fields such as engineering design, supplier selection, project management, and strategic planning, where decision-makers must simultaneously consider multiple, often competing objectives.

The WPM is closely related to other MCDA methods including the Analytic Hierarchy Process (AHP), TOPSIS, and ELECTRE, and is sometimes used in conjunction with these techniques in hybrid decision-making frameworks.

== Description ==
As with all MCDA / MCDM methods, given is a finite set of decision alternatives described in terms of a number of decision criteria. Each decision alternative is compared with the others by multiplying a number of ratios, one for each decision criterion. Each ratio is raised to the power equivalent to the relative weight of the corresponding criterion.

Suppose that a given MCDA problem is defined on m alternatives and n decision criteria. Furthermore, let us assume that all the criteria are benefit criteria. That is, the higher the values are, the better it is. Next suppose that w_{j} denotes the relative weight of importance of the criterion C_{j} and a_{ij} is the performance value of alternative A_{i} when it is evaluated in terms of criterion C_{j}. Then, if one wishes to compare the two alternatives A_{K} and A_{L} (where m ≥ K, L ≥ 1) then, the following product has to be calculated:

$$P( A_K / A_L ) = \prod_{j=1}^n ( a_{Kj} / a_{Lj} ) ^{w_j},  \text{ for }K, L = 1, 2, 3,\dots, m.$$

If the ratio P(A_{K}/A_{L}) is greater than or equal to the value 1, then it indicates that alternative A_{K} is more desirable than alternative A_{L} (in the maximization case). If we are interested in determining the best alternative, then the best alternative is the one that is better than or at least equal to all other alternatives.

The WPM is often called dimensionless analysis because its mathematical structure eliminates any units of measure.

Therefore, the WPM can be used in single- and multi-dimensional MCDA / MCDM problems. That is, on decision problems where the alternatives are described in terms that use different units of measurement. An advantage of this method is that instead of the actual values it can use relative ones.

The following is a simple numerical example which illustrates how the calculations for this method can be carried out. As data we use the same numerical values as in the numerical example described for the weighted sum model. These numerical data are repeated next for easier reference.

== Example ==
This simple decision problem is based on three alternatives denoted as A_{1}, A_{2}, and A_{3} each described in terms of four criteria C_{1}, C_{2}, C_{3} and C_{4}. Next, let the numerical data for this problem be as in the following decision matrix:

	C_{1}	C_{2}	C_{3}	C_{4}
Alts.	0.20	0.15	0.40	0.25
A_{1}	25	20	15	30
A_{2}	10	30	20	30
A_{3}	30	10	30	10

The above table specifies that the relative weight of the first criterion is 0.20, the relative weight for the second criterion is 0.15 and so on. Similarly, the value of the first alternative (i.e., A_{1}) in terms of the first criterion is equal to 25, the value of the same alternative in terms of the second criterion is equal to 20 and so on. However, now the restriction to express all criteria in terms of the same measurement unit is not needed. That is, the numbers under each criterion may be expressed in different units.

When the WPM is applied on the previous data, then the following values are derived:

$$P( A_1 / A_2 ) =  (25/10) ^{0.20} \times (20/30) ^{0.15} \times (15/20) ^{0.40} \times (30/30) ^{0.25}  = 1.007 > 1.$$

Similarly, we also get:

$$P( A_1 / A_3) =  1.067 > 1,\text{ and } P( A_2 / A_3) =  1.059 > 1. \,$$

Therefore, the best alternative is A_{1}, since it is superior to all the other alternatives. Furthermore, the following ranking of all three alternatives is as follows: A_{1} > A_{2} > A_{3} (where the symbol ">" stands for "better than").

An alternative approach with the WPM method is for the decision maker to use only products without the previous ratios. That is, to use the following variant of main formula given earlier:

$$P( A_K ) = \prod_{j=1}^n ( a_{Kj} ) ^{w_j}, \text{ for } K = 1, 2, 3, \dots , m.$$

In the previous expression the term P(A_{K}) denotes the total performance value (i.e., not a relative one) of alternative A_{K} when all the criteria are considered simultaneously under the WPM model. Then, when the previous data are used, exactly the same ranking is derived. Some interesting properties of this method are discussed in the 2000 book by Triantaphyllou on MCDA / MCDM.

An illustrative application is provided by Watters and Tofallis.

== Choosing the weights ==
The choice of values for the weights is usually difficult. The simple default of equal weighting is sometimes used. Scoring methods such as WSM and WPM may be used for rankings (universities, countries, consumer products etc.), and the weights will determine the order in which these entities are placed. There is often much argument about the appropriateness of the chosen weights, and whether they are biased or display favouritism.
One approach for overcoming this issue is to automatically generate the weights from the data. This has the advantage of avoiding personal input and so is more objective. The so-called Automatic Democratic Method for weight generation has two key steps:

(1) For each alternative, identify the weights which will maximize its score, subject to the condition that these weights do not lead to any of the alternatives exceeding a score of 100%.

(2) Fit an equation to these optimal scores using regression so that the regression equation predicts these scores as closely as possible using the criteria data as explanatory variables. The regression coefficients then provide the final weights.

== History ==
Some of the first references to this method are due to Bridgman and Miller and Starr. The tutorial article by Tofallis describes its advantages over the weighted sum approach.

== See also ==
- Ordinal Priority Approach
- Weighted sum model

More details on this method are given in the MCDM book by Triantaphyllou.
