= Controlled area =

Secure telecommunications area

In telecommunications, a controlled area is an area in which uncontrolled movement will not result in compromise of classified information, that is designed to provide administrative control and safety, or that serves as a buffer for controlling access to limited-access areas. It can also refer to an area to which security controls have been applied to protect an information-processing system's equipment and wirelines, equivalent to that required for the information transmitted through the system.
