= Evidential reasoning approach =

In decision theory, the evidential reasoning approach (ER) is a generic evidence-based multi-criteria decision analysis (MCDA) approach for dealing with problems having both quantitative and qualitative criteria under various uncertainties including ignorance and randomness. It has been used to support various decision analysis, assessment and evaluation activities such as environmental impact assessment and organizational self-assessment based on a range of quality models.

== Overview ==
The evidential reasoning approach has recently been developed on the basis of decision theory in particular utility theory, artificial intelligence in particular the theory of evidence, statistical analysis and computer technology. It uses a belief structure to model an assessment with uncertainty, a belief decision matrix to represent an MCDA problem under uncertainty, evidential reasoning algorithms to aggregate criteria for generating distributed assessments, and the concepts of the belief and plausibility functions to generate a utility interval for measuring the degree of ignorance. A conventional decision matrix used for modeling an MCDA problem is a special case of a belief decision matrix.

The use of belief decision matrices for MCDA problem modelling in the ER approach results in the following features:

1. An assessment of an option can be more reliably and realistically represented by a belief decision matrix than by a conventional decision matrix.
2. It accepts data of different formats with various types of uncertainties as inputs, such as single numerical values, probability distributions, and subjective judgments with belief degrees.
3. It allows all available information embedded in different data formats, including qualitative and incomplete data, to be maximally incorporated in assessment and decision making processes.
4. It allows assessment outcomes to be represented more informatively.
5. It reduces the uncertainty in human and AI decisions.

== See also ==
- Decision-making software
- Ordinal Priority Approach (OPA)
