= SMAA =

SMAA may refer to:

- The Stieglitz Museum of Applied Arts
- Enhanced Subpixel Morphological Antialiasing, a computer graphics antialiasing technique
- Stochastic multicriteria acceptability analysis, a multiple criteria decision aiding method
- Switchmen's Mutual Aid Association, an American trade union, 1886-1894
