= Decision matrix =

List of values for comparison

A decision matrix is a list of values in rows and columns that allows an analyst to systematically identify, analyze, and rate the performance of relationships between sets of values and information. Elements of a decision matrix show decisions based on certain decision criteria. The matrix is useful for looking at large masses of decision factors and assessing each factor's relative significance by weighting them by importance.

== Multiple-criteria decision analysis ==
The term decision matrix is used to describe a multiple-criteria decision analysis (MCDA) problem. An MCDA problem, where there are M alternative options and each needs to be assessed on N criteria, can be described by the decision matrix which has N rows and M columns, or M × N elements, as shown in the following table. Each element, such as X_{ij}, is either a single numerical value or a single grade, representing the performance of alternative i on criterion j. For example, if alternative i is "car i", criterion j is "engine quality" assessed by five grades {Exceptional, Good, Average, Below Average, Poor}, and "Car i" is assessed to be "Good" on "engine quality", then X_{ij} = "Good". These assessments may be replaced by scores, from 1 to 5. Sums of scores may then be compared and ranked, to show the winning proposal.

Example of Comparison
| | Alternative 1 | Alternative 2 | ... | Alternative M |
|---|---|---|---|---|
| Criterion 1 | x_{11} | x_{12} | ... | x_{1M} |
| Criterion 2 | x_{21} | x_{22} | ... | x_{2M} |
| ... | ... | ... | X_{ij} = Good | ... |
| Criterion N | x_{N1} | x_{N2} | ... | x_{NM} |
| Sum | | | | |
| Rank | | | | |
| Status | | No | | No |

== Belief decision matrix ==
Similar to a decision matrix, a belief decision matrix is used to describe a multiple criteria decision analysis (MCDA) problem in the Evidential Reasoning Approach. Instead of being a single numerical value or a single grade as in a decision matrix, each element in a belief decision matrix is a belief distribution.

For example, suppose Alternative i is "Car i", Criterion j is "Engine Quality" assessed by five grades {Excellent, Good, Average, Below Average, Poor}, and "Car i" is assessed to be “Excellent” on "Engine Quality" with a high degree of belief (e.g. 0.6) due to its low fuel consumption, low vibration and high responsiveness. At the same time, the quality is also assessed to be only “Good” with a lower degree of belief (e.g. 0.4 or less) because its quietness and starting can still be improved. If this is the case, then we have X_{ij}={ (Excellent, 0.6), (Good, 0.4)}, or X_{ij}={ (Excellent, 0.6), (Good, 0.4), (Average, 0), (Below Average, 0), (Poor, 0)}.

A conventional decision matrix is a special case of belief decision matrix when only one belief degree in a belief structure is 1 and the others are 0.

| | Criterion 1 | Criterion 2 | ... | Criterion N |
|---|---|---|---|---|
| Alternative 1 | x_{11} | x_{12} | ... | x_{1N} |
| Alternative 2 | x_{21} | x_{22} | ... | x_{2N} |
| ... | ... | ... | X_{ij}={ (Excellent, 0.6), (Good, 0.4)} | ... |
| Alternative M | x_{M1} | x_{M2} | ... | x_{MN} |

== See also ==
- Belief structure
- Decisional balance sheet
- Decision-matrix method
