= Compromise =

Negotiation strategy

To compromise is to make a deal between different parties where each party gives up part of their demand. In arguments, compromise means finding agreement through communication, through a mutual acceptance of terms—often involving variations from an original goal or desires. Defining and finding the best possible compromise is an important problem in fields like game theory and the voting system.

Research indicates that suboptimal compromises are often the result of negotiators failing to realize when they have interests that are completely compatible with those of the other party, leading them to settle for suboptimal agreements. Mutually better outcomes can often be found by careful investigation of both parties' interests, especially if done early in negotiations.

The compromise solution of a multicriteria decision making or multi-criteria decision analysis problem that is the closest to the ideal could be determined by the VIKOR method, which provides a maximum utility of the majority, and a minimum individual regret of the opponent.

== Politics ==
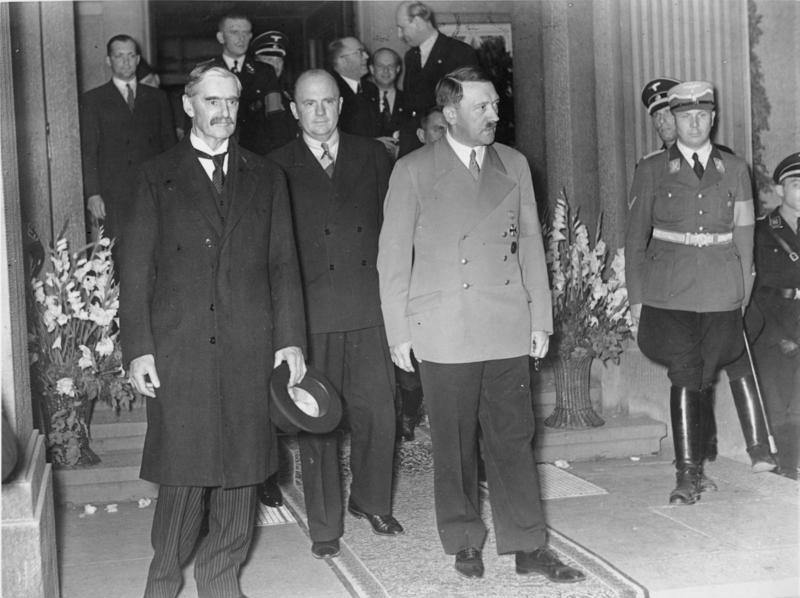
Chamberlain (left) and Hitler, 1938.

In international politics, compromises often discussed include infamous deals with dictators, such as Neville Chamberlain's appeasement of Adolf Hitler. Margalit calls these "rotten compromises." In the United States and other democratic countries, many politicians of recent times permanently campaign to gain reelection. Thus, United States Ambassador to Germany Amy Gutmann and political scientist Dennis F. Thompson have observed that compromise is more difficult. The problem of political compromise in general is an important subject in political ethics. Political moralists have often considered unwillingness to compromise as virtuous. Yet politicians willing to compromise can reduce partisanship and hostility. Hence politics is sometimes called the "art of compromise". Polling by the American Survey Center indicates that Americans take a favorable view of political compromise.

== Human relationships ==
In human relationships, "compromise" can make no party happy because the parties involved feel that they either gave away too much or that they received too little. Compromise may be referred to as capitulation, a "surrender" of objectives, principles, or material. Extremism is often considered as an antonym to compromise, which, depending on context, may be associated with concepts of balance and tolerance.

== See also ==
- Compromise of 1850 – American legislative compromise
- Compromise of 1867 – Establishment of Austria-Hungary
- Connecticut Compromise – Agreement which established the structure of the United States federal legislature
- Constitution – Fundamental principles that govern a state
- False balance – Reporting on a fringe assertion as if it were legitimate debate
- Hardline – Inflexible stance on a political issue
- Missouri Compromise – 1820 United States federal legislation
- Three-Fifths Compromise – Superseded US Constitution clause counting slaves
- Trade-off – Situational decision
