= Decision EXpert =

DEX (Decision EXpert) is a qualitative multi-criteria decision analysis (MCDA) method for decision making and is implemented in DEX software. This method was developed by a research team led by Bohanec, Bratko, and Rajkovič. The method supports decision makers in making complex decisions based on multiple, possibly conflicting, attributes. In DEX, all attributes are qualitative and can take values represented by words, such as “low” or “excellent”. Attributes are generally organized in a hierarchy. The evaluation of decision alternatives is carried out by utility functions, which are represented in the form of decision rules. All attributes (function arguments and outcomes) are assumed to be discrete. Additionally, they can be preferentially ordered, so that a higher ordinal value represents a better preference.

== History ==
The origins of the DEX method can be traced back to the work of Efstathiou and Rajkovič (1979). Their idea was to use words instead of the numbers in multi-criteria decision models and to use tables to represent utility functions. The method was further developed by Slovenian researchers Vladislav Rajkovič and Marko Bohanec, who extended it to cope with hierarchies of attributes and to facilitate the acquisition and explanation of decision knowledge from experts and decision analysts. This method was called DECMAK. In 1987, after an implementation of a supporting computer program, the method was named DEX (Decision EXpert). In the 1990s, DEX was already used to solve complex decision making problems in industry, health-care, project evaluation, housing, and sports. In 2000, DEX was implemented as DEXi software. Updated versions of DEXi, as well as other DEX-related software tools, are accessible on the DEX Software website.

== DEX Method ==
DEX (Decision EXpert) is a multi-criteria decision modelling method. Its main distinguishing characteristics are:

- DEX is hierarchical: multi-criteria models developed by DEX consist of attributes, organized in a hierarchy. This is similar to other MCDA methods, such as Analytic Hierarchy Process (AHP). The hierarchy represents a decomposition of a decision problem into simpler sub-problems, so that higher-level attributes depend on the lower-level ones. In general, the hierarchy is a directed acyclic graph (DAG), whose terminal nodes represent inputs, and roots represent the outputs of the model.
- DEX is qualitative: it uses symbolic attributes, in contrast with the majority of MCDA methods, which use numeric attributes. In DEX, each of the attributes has a finite value scale consisting of symbolic values, such as “low”, “medium” and “high”. These scales are usually small (from 2 to 5 values) and preferentially ordered.
- DEX is rule-based: the evaluation of decision alternatives is defined in terms of decision rules.

A DEX model consists of the following components:

- Attributes: symbolic variables that represent basic properties of decision alternatives.
- Scales of attributes: which are qualitative and therefore consist of a set of words, like: 'inappropriate', 'acceptable', 'good', etc. Mostly, scales of attributes are preferentially ordered.
- Hierarchy of attributes: represents the decomposition of the complex decision problem into less complex subproblems.
- Decision rules: utility functions, represented in the form of decision tables, which determine the aggregation of lower-level attributes to higher-level ones.

== Practical Example ==
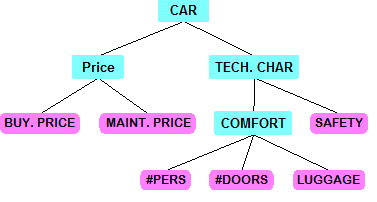
Hierarchical structure for car evaluation example

The main concepts of DEX method are illustrated with a simple model for the evaluation of cars. This model is distributed together with free DEXi software and is used throughout DEX literature to illustrate the method. It has been also used to make the Car Evaluation Data Set in the UCI Machine Learning Repository.

The hierarchy in this example consists of ten attributes from which six are basic attributes and represent observed features of cars:

- BUY.PRICE - buying price
- MAINT.PRICE - maintenance price
- #PERS - number of persons
- #DOORS - number of doors
- LUGGAGE - place for luggage
- SAFETY - safety of the car.

The overall evaluation of the root attribute CAR is done through three aggregated intermediate attributes:

- COMFORT - convenience of the car
- TECH.CHAR. - technical characteristics
- PRICE - overall price.

Figure below shows the value scales for all the attributes.

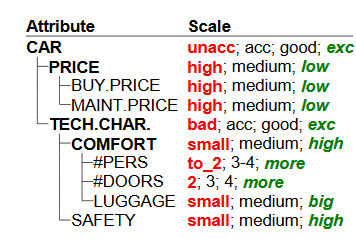
Hierarchy and scales of attributes for Car evaluation problem

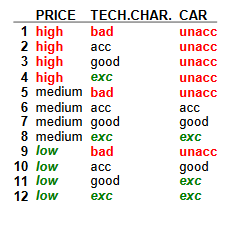
DEX decision table for car evaluation example

Decision rules that correspond to the CAR attribute are shown in the figure on the right. These rules define mapping from all the combinations of values of PRICE and TECH.CHAR. into the values of CAR. Since the attributes PRICE and TECH.CHAR. have three and four values, respectively, decision table contains 3 x 4 = 12 rules. Each row represents a certain value of CAR for one combination of the values of PRICE and TECH.CHAR. The fourth row, for example, means that

if PRICE=high and TECH.CHAR.=exc. then CAR=unacc. 

In DEX model decision rules must be defined for all aggregate attributes in the model. In the case of our example model contains three decision tables for intermediate attributes COMFORT, TECH.CHAR. and PRICE.

Decision alternatives (i.e., cars in this example) are evaluated according to input data provided by the decision maker by aggregation from basic attributes towards the root node of the DEX model. The figure below represents the evaluation of three alternatives (cars).

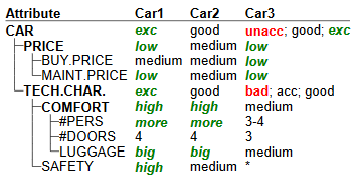
Evaluation of three cars in DEX

DEX can handle missing information, which can be seen from the evaluation of Car3. Unknown value for SAFETY basic attribute (denoted by '*') is handled by considering all possible values of this attribute. As a result, set of values (rather than a single value) are assigned to attributes TECH.CHAR. and CAR.

== Implementation ==
The method DEX is implemented as DEXi software, which is freely available and supports the development of DEX models as well as the evaluation and analysis of all decision alternatives. DEXi checks the completeness (they provide evaluation results for all possible combinations of basic attributes’ values) and consistency (defined aggregation functions obey the principle of dominance, i.e., they are monotone with respect to all preferentially ordered basic criteria) of the model.

DEXi software also supports analysis of the evaluated alternatives. There are four analysis procedures available in the software:

- Plus-minus analysis: checks how small changes to input attribute values affect the evaluation of alternatives
- Selective explanation: provides information about the strong and weak components of each alternative
- Compare: compares the chosen alternatives via attributes
- Option generation (also called Target analysis): finding alternative ways of improving or degrading a given alternative.
