= Stochastic multicriteria acceptability analysis =

Stochastic multicriteria acceptability analysis (SMAA) is a multiple-criteria decision analysis method for problems with missing or incomplete information.

== Description ==
This means that criteria and preference information can be uncertain, inaccurate or partially missing. Incomplete information is represented in SMAA using suitable probability distributions. The method is based on stochastic simulation by drawing random values for criteria measurements and weights from their corresponding distributions.

SMAA can handle mixed cardinal and ordinal information. Ordinal information is treated by a special joint distribution that preserves the ordinal information.

A survey on different variants and applications of SMAA can be found in this article.

Open source implementations of SMAA can be found at the website SMAA.fi.
