= Best worst method =

Best Worst Method (BWM) is a multi-criteria decision-making (MCDM) method that was proposed by Dr. Jafar Rezaei in 2015. The method is used to evaluate a set of alternatives with respect to a set of decision criteria. The BWM is based on pairwise comparisons of the decision criteria. That is, after identifying the decision criteria by the decision-maker (DM), two criteria are selected by the DM: the best criterion and the worst criterion. The best criterion is the one that has the most important role in making the decision, while the worst criterion has the opposite role. The DM then gives his/her preferences of the best criterion over all the other criteria and also his/her preferences of all the criteria over the worst criterion using a number from a predefined scale (e.g. 1 to 9). These two sets of pairwise comparisons are used as input for an optimization problem, the optimal results of which are the weights of the criteria. The salient feature of the BWM is that it uses a structured way to generate pairwise comparisons which leads to reliable results.
