= Aggregated indices randomization method =

In applied mathematics and decision making, the aggregated indices randomization method (AIRM) is a modification of a well-known aggregated indices method, targeting complex objects subjected to multi-criteria estimation under uncertainty. AIRM was first developed by the Russian naval applied mathematician Aleksey Krylov around 1908.

The main advantage of AIRM over other variants of aggregated indices methods is its ability to cope with poor-quality input information. It can use non-numeric (ordinal), non-exact (interval) and non-complete expert information to solve multi-criteria decision analysis (MCDM) problems. An exact and transparent mathematical foundation can assure the precision and fidelity of AIRM results.

== Background ==
Ordinary aggregated indices method allows comprehensive estimation of complex (multi-attribute) objects’ quality. Examples of such complex objects (decision alternatives, variants of a choice, etc.) may be found in diverse areas of business, industry, science, etc. (e.g., large-scale technical systems, long-time projects, alternatives of a crucial financial/managerial decision, consumer goods/services, and so on). There is a wide diversity of qualities under evaluation too: efficiency, performance, productivity, safety, reliability, utility, etc.

The essence of the aggregated indices method consists in an aggregation (convolution, synthesizing, etc.) of some single indices (criteria) q(1),...,q(m), each single index being an estimation of a fixed quality of multiattribute objects under investigation, into one aggregated index (criterion) Q=Q(q(1),...,q(m)).

In other words, in the aggregated indices method single estimations of an object, each of them being made from a single (specific) “point of view” (single criterion), is synthesized by aggregative function Q=Q(q(1),...,q(m)) in one aggregated (general) object's estimation Q, which is made from the general “point of view” (general criterion).

Aggregated index Q value is determined not only by single indices’ values but varies depending on non-negative weight-coefficients w(1),...,w(m). Weight-coefficient (“weight”) w(i) is treated as a measure of relative significance of the corresponding single index q(i) for general estimation Q of the quality level.

== Summary ==
It is well known that the most subtle and delicate stage in a variant of the aggregated indices method is the stage of weights estimation because of usual shortage of information about exact values of weight-coefficients. As a rule, we have only non-numerical (ordinal) information, which can be represented by a system of equalities and inequalities for weights, and/or non-exact (interval) information, which can be represented by a system of inequalities, which determine only intervals for the weight-coefficients possible values. Usually ordinal and/or interval information is incomplete (i.e., this information is not enough for one-valued estimation of all weight-coefficients). So, one can say that there is only non-numerical (ordinal), non-exact (interval), and non-complete information (NNN-information) I about weight-coefficient.

As information I about weights is incomplete, then weight-vector w=(w(1),...,w(m)) is ambiguously determined, i.e., this vector is determined with accuracy to within a set W(I) of all admissible (from the point of view of NNN-information I) weight-vectors. To model such uncertainty we shall address ourselves to the concept of Bayesian randomization. In accordance with the concept, an uncertain choice of a weight-vector from set W(I) is modeling by a random choice of an element of the set. Such randomization produces a random weight-vector W(I)=(W(1;I),...,W(m;I)), which is uniformly distributed on the set W(I).

Mathematical expectation of random weight-coefficient W(i;I) may be used as a numerical estimation of particular index (criterion) q(i) significance, exactness of this estimation being measured by standard deviation of the corresponding random variable. Since such estimations of single indices significance are determined on the base of NNN-information I, these estimations may be treated as a result of quantification of the non-numerical, inexact and incomplete information I.

An aggregative function Q(q(1),...,q(m)) depends on weight-coefficients. Therefore, random weight-vector (W(1;I),...,W(m;I)) induces randomization of an aggregated index Q, i.e., its transformation in the corresponding randomized aggregated index Q(I). The looked for average aggregated estimation of objects’ quality level may be identified now with mathematical expectation of corresponded random aggregated index Q(I). The measure of the aggregated estimation's exactness may be identified with the standard deviation of the correspondent random index.

== Applications ==
- Support of crucial managerial decisions of high level, which characterized by a great volume of non-numeric and uncertain information
- Estimation under uncertainty of complex technical systems efficiency, capacity and performance
- Multi-criteria choice of alternatives under shortage of information about criteria priorities; revelation of decision-making person priorities
- Synthesis of a collective opinion of an expert committee under deficiency of information about expert qualification
- Construction of hierarchical systems of decision-making (hierarchical systems of evaluation of complex multilevel objects) under uncertainty
- Multi-criteria pattern recognition and classification under shortage of information about significance and reliability of employed sources of data
- Multi-criteria evaluation and prognosis of dynamic alternatives for economical, financial and insurance juncture
- Allocation of resources (investments) when only nonnumeric, inexact and incomplete information about admissible investments is attainable.
- Multilateral analysis of financial institutes (commercial banks, insurance companies, investment funds, etc.) efficiency and reliability under uncertainty; flexible multi-criteria express-rating of financial institutes.

== History ==
The aggregated indices method was explicitly represented by colonel Aleksey Krylov (the well known Russian specialist in applied mathematics, member of the Russian Academy of Sciences, professor of Russian Navy Academy, etc., etc.) in his propositions (March, 1908) for selection of the best project of new Russian battleships (about 40 projects with about 150 initial attributes).

Different modifications of the Aggregated Indices Randomization Method (AIRM) are developing from 1972 year in Saint Petersburg State University and in Saint Petersburg Institute of Informatics of Russian Academy of Sciences (SPIIRAS).

== Publications ==
- Hovanov N.V. (1981). Stochastic field of experts' ordinal estimates aggregation. Proceedings of the First Congress on Statistic and Discrete Analysis of Non-numeric Information. Moscow (Russia): Moscow State University. pp. 58–9.
- Hovanov N.; Yudaeva M.; Hovanov K. (2007). "Multicriteria estimation of probabilities on basis of expert non-numeric, non-exact and non-complete knowledge". European Journal of Operational Research. 195 (3): 857–863. doi:10.1016/j.ejor.2007.11.018.
- Hovanov N.; Kolari J.; Sokolov V. (2008). "Deriving weights from general pairwise comparison matrices". Mathematical Social Sciences. 55 (2): 205–220. doi:10.1016/j.mathsocsci.2007.07.006.
- Popovich V.; Hovanov N.; Schrenk M.; Prokaev A.; Smirnova A. (2008). Schrenk M.; et al. (eds.). Situation assessment in everyday life (PDF). Proceedings of the 13th International Conference Urban Planning, Regional Development and Information Society. Vienna: Real Corp 008. pp. 637–652.

== See also ==
- Decision-making software
