= Bowman Municipal Airport =

Public airport near Bowman, ND, US

Coordinates: 46°11′13″N 103°25′41″W

- IATA: BWM; ICAO: KBPP; FAA LID: BPP

Summary
- Airport type: Public
- Operator: Bowman County Airport Authority
- Serves: Bowman, North Dakota
- Elevation AMSL: 2,958 ft (902 m)
- Interactive map of Bowman Municipal Airport

Runways
Direction	Length		Surface
Direction	ft	m	Surface
11/29	4,800	1,463	Asphalt

Statistics (2007)
- Aircraft operations: 3,620
- Source: Federal Aviation Administration

Bowman Municipal Airport (IATA: BWM, ICAO: KBPP, FAA LID: BPP) is a public airport located two miles (3 km) west of the central business district of Bowman, a city in Bowman County, North Dakota, United States. It is owned by the Bowman County Airport Authority.

Although most U.S. airports use the same three-letter location identifier for the FAA and IATA, Bowman Municipal Airport is assigned BPP by the FAA and BWM by the IATA.

== Facilities and aircraft ==
Bowman Municipal Airport covers an area of 160 acres (65 ha) which contains one runway designated 11/29 with a 4,800 x 75 ft (1,463 x 23 m) asphalt surface. For the 12-month period ending July 31, 2007, the airport had 3,620 aircraft operations: 88% general aviation, 11% air taxi, and 1% military.
