= Weighted sum model =

Model for decision analysis

In decision theory, the weighted sum model (WSM), also called weighted linear combination (WLC) or simple additive weighting (SAW), is the best known and simplest multi-criteria decision analysis (MCDA) / multi-criteria decision making method for evaluating a number of alternatives in terms of a number of decision criteria.

== Description ==
In general, suppose that a given MCDA problem is defined on m alternatives and n decision criteria. Furthermore, let us assume that all the criteria are benefit criteria, that is, the higher the values are, the better it is. Next suppose that w_{j} denotes the relative weight of importance of the criterion C_{j} and a_{ij} is the performance value of alternative A_{i} when it is evaluated in terms of criterion C_{j}. Then, the total (i.e., when all the criteria are considered simultaneously) importance of alternative A_{i}, denoted as A_{i}^{WSM-score}, is defined as follows:

$$A^\text{WSM-score}_i = \sum_{j=1}^n w_j a_{ij},\text{ for }i = 1, 2, 3, \dots , m.$$

For the maximization case, the best alternative is the one that yields the maximum total performance value.

It is very important to state here that it is applicable only when all the data are expressed in exactly the same unit. If this is not the case, then the final result is equivalent to "adding apples and oranges."

== Example ==
For a simple numerical example suppose that a decision problem of this type is defined on three alternative choices A_{1}, A_{2}, A_{3} each described in terms of four criteria C_{1}, C_{2}, C_{3} and C_{4}. Furthermore, let the numerical data for this problem be as in the following decision matrix:

	Criteria				WSM Score
	C_{1}	C_{2}	C_{3}	C_{4}	WSM Score
Weighting	0.20	0.15	0.40	0.25	–
Choice A_{1}	25	20	15	30	21.50
Choice A_{2}	10	30	20	30	22.00
Choice A_{3}	30	10	30	10	22.00

For instance, the relative weight of the first criterion is equal to 0.20, the relative weight for the second criterion is 0.15 and so on. Similarly, the value of the first alternative (i.e., A_{1}) in terms of the first criterion is equal to 25, the value of the same alternative in terms of the second criterion is equal to 20 and so on.

When the previous formula is applied on these numerical data the WSM scores for the three alternatives are:

$$A^\text{WSM-score} _1 = 25 \times 0.20 + 20 \times 0.15 + 15 \times 0.40 + 30\times 0.25 = 21.50.$$

Similarly, one gets:

$$A^\text{WSM-score} _2 = 22.00,\text{ and }A^\text{WSM-score}_3 = 22.00.$$

Thus, the best choice (in the maximization case) is either alternative A_{2} or A_{3} (because they both have the maximum WSM score which is equal to 22.00). These numerical results imply the following ranking of these three alternatives: A_{2} = A_{3} > A_{1} (where the symbol ">" stands for "greater than").

== Choosing the weights ==
The choice of values for the weights is rarely easy. The simple default of equal weighting is sometimes used when all criteria are measured in the same units. Scoring methods may be used for rankings (universities, countries, consumer products etc.), and the weights will determine the order in which these entities are placed. There is often much argument about the appropriateness of the chosen weights, and whether they are biased or display favouritism.
One approach for overcoming this issue is to automatically generate the weights from the data. This has the advantage of avoiding personal input and so is more objective. The so-called Automatic Democratic Method for weight generation has two key steps:

(1) For each alternative, identify the weights which will maximize its score, subject to the condition that these weights do not lead to any of the alternatives exceeding a score of 100%.

(2) Fit an equation to these optimal scores using regression so that the regression equation predicts these scores as closely as possible using the criteria data as explanatory variables. The regression coefficients then provide the final weights.

== See also ==
- Decision-making software
- Weighted product model
