= Preference ranking organization method for enrichment evaluation =

Promethee & Gaia, tools for management

The Preference Ranking Organization METHod for Enrichment of Evaluations and its descriptive complement geometrical analysis for interactive aid are better known as the Promethee and Gaia methods.

Based on mathematics and sociology, the Promethee and Gaia method was developed at the beginning of the 1980s and has been extensively studied and refined since then.

It has particular application in decision making, and is used around the world in a wide variety of decision scenarios, in fields such as business, governmental institutions, transportation, healthcare and education.

Rather than pointing out a "right" decision, the Promethee and Gaia method helps decision makers find the alternative that best suits their goal and their understanding of the problem. It provides a comprehensive and rational framework for structuring a decision problem, identifying and quantifying its conflicts and synergies, clusters of actions, and highlight the main alternatives and the structured reasoning behind.

== History ==
The basic elements of the Promethee method have been first introduced by Professor Jean-Pierre Brans (CSOO, VUB Vrije Universiteit Brussel) in 1982. It was later developed and implemented by Professor Jean-Pierre Brans and Professor Bertrand Mareschal (Solvay Brussels School of Economics and Management, ULB Université Libre de Bruxelles), including extensions such as GAIA.

The descriptive approach, named Gaia, allows the decision maker to visualize the main features of a decision problem: he/she is able to easily identify conflicts or synergies between criteria, to identify clusters of actions and to highlight remarkable performances.

The prescriptive approach, named Promethee, provides the decision maker with both complete and partial rankings of the actions.

Promethee has successfully been used in many decision making contexts worldwide. A non-exhaustive list of scientific publications about extensions, applications and discussions related to the Promethee methods was published in 2010.

== Uses and applications ==
While it can be used by individuals working on straightforward decisions, the Promethee & Gaia is most useful where groups of people are working on complex problems, especially those with several criteria, involving a lot of human perceptions and judgments, whose decisions have long-term impact. It has unique advantages when important elements of the decision are difficult to quantify or compare, or where collaboration among departments or team members are constrained by their different specializations or perspectives.

Decision situations to which the Promethee and Gaia can be applied include:

- Choice – The selection of one alternative from a given set of alternatives, usually where there are multiple decision criteria involved.
- Prioritization – Determining the relative merit of members of a set of alternatives, as opposed to selecting a single one or merely ranking them.
- Resource allocation – Allocating resources among a set of alternatives
- Ranking – Putting a set of alternatives in order from most to least preferred
- Conflict resolution – Settling disputes between parties with apparently incompatible objectives

The applications of Promethee and Gaia to complex multi-criteria decision scenarios have numbered in the thousands, and have produced extensive results in problems involving planning, resource allocation, priority setting, and selection among alternatives. Other areas have included forecasting, talent selection, and tender analysis.

Some uses of Promethee and Gaia have become case-studies. Recently these have included:

- Deciding which resources are the best with the available budget to meet SPS quality standards (STDF – WTO) [See more in External Links]
- Selecting new route for train performance (Italferr)[See more in External Links]

== The mathematical model ==
=== Assumptions ===
Let $A=\{a_1 ,..,a_n\}$ be a set of n actions and let $F=\{f_1 ,..,f_q\}$ be a consistent family of q criteria. Without loss of generality, we will assume that these criteria have to be maximized.

The basic data related to such a problem can be written in a table containing $n\times q$ evaluations. Each line corresponds to an action and each column corresponds to a criterion.

$$\begin{array}{|c|c|c|c|c|c|c|} \hline
& f_{1}(\cdot) & f_{2}(\cdot) & \cdots & f_{j}(\cdot) & \cdots & f_{q}(\cdot) \\ \hline
a_{1} & f_{1}(a_{1}) & f_{2}(a_{1}) & \cdots & f_{j}(a_{1}) & \cdots & f_{q}(a_{1}) \\
\hline
a_{2} & f_{1}(a_{2}) & f_{2}(a_{2}) & \cdots & f_{j}(a_{2}) & \cdots & f_{q}(a_{2}) \\ \hline
\cdots & \cdots &\cdots  & \cdots & \cdots & \cdots & .\cdots \\ \hline
a_{i} & f_{1}(a_{i}) & f_{2}(a_{i}) & \cdots & f_{j}(a_{i}) & \cdots & f_{q}(a_{i}) \\ \hline
\cdots & \cdots & \cdots &  \cdots& \cdots & \cdots & \cdots \\ \hline
a_{n} & f_{1}(a_{n}) & f_{2}(a_{n}) &  \cdots & f_{j}(a_{n}) & \cdots&
f_{q}(a_{n})
\\ \hline
\end{array}$$

=== Pairwise comparisons ===
At first, pairwise comparisons will be made between all the actions for each criterion:

$$d_k(a_i,a_j)=f_k(a_i)-f_k(a_j)$$

$d_k(a_i,a_j)$ is the difference between the evaluations of two actions for criterion $f_k$. Of course, these differences depend on the measurement scales used and are not always easy to compare for the decision maker.

=== Preference degree ===
As a consequence the notion of preference function is introduced to translate the difference into a unicriterion preference degree as follows:

$$\pi_k(a_i,a_j)=P_k[d_k(a_i,a_j)]$$

where $P_k:\R\rightarrow[0,1]$ is a positive non-decreasing preference function such that $P_k(0)=0$. Six different types of preference function are proposed in the original Promethee definition. Among them, the linear unicriterion preference function is often used in practice for quantitative criteria:

$$P_k(x) \begin{cases} 0, & \text{if } x\le q_k \\ \frac{x-q_k}{p_k-q_k}, & \text{if } q_k<x\le p_k \\ 1, & \text{if } x>p_k  \end{cases}$$

where $q_j$ and $p_j$ are respectively the indifference and preference thresholds. The meaning of these parameters is the following: when the difference is smaller than the indifference threshold it is considered as negligible by the decision maker. Therefore, the corresponding unicriterion preference degree is equal to zero. If the difference exceeds the preference threshold it is considered to be significant. Therefore, the unicriterion preference degree is equal to one (the maximum value). When the difference is between the two thresholds, an intermediate value is computed for the preference degree using a linear interpolation.

=== Multicriteria preference degree ===
When a preference function has been associated to each criterion by the decision maker, all comparisons between all pairs of actions can be done for all the criteria. A multicriteria preference degree is then computed to globally compare every couple of actions:

$$\pi(a,b)=\displaystyle\sum_{k=1}^qP_{k}(a,b)\cdot w_{k}$$

Where $w_k$ represents the weight of criterion $f_k$. It is assumed that $w_k\ge 0$ and $\sum_{k=1}^q w_{k}=1$. As a direct consequence, we have:

$$\pi(a_i,a_j)\ge 0$$

$$\pi(a_i,a_j)+\pi(a_j,a_i)\le 1$$

=== Multicriteria preference flows ===
In order to position every action with respect to all the other actions, two scores are computed:

$$\phi^{+}(a)=\frac{1}{n-1}\displaystyle\sum_{x \in A}\pi(a,x)$$
$$\phi^{-}(a)=\frac{1}{n-1}\displaystyle\sum_{x \in  A}\pi(x,a)$$

The positive preference flow $\phi^{+}(a_i)$ quantifies how a given action $a_i$ is globally preferred to all the other actions while the negative preference flow $\phi^{-}(a_i)$ quantifies how a given action $a_i$ is being globally preferred by all the other actions. An ideal action would have a positive preference flow equal to 1 and a negative preference flow equal to 0. The two preference flows induce two generally different complete rankings on the set of actions. The first one is obtained by ranking the actions according to the decreasing values of their positive flow scores. The second one is obtained by ranking the actions according to the increasing values of their negative flow scores. The Promethee I partial ranking is defined as the intersection of these two rankings. As a consequence, an action $a_i$ will be as good as another action $a_j$ if $\phi^{+}(a_i) \ge \phi^{+}(a_j)$ and $\phi^{-}(a_i)\le \phi^{-}(a_j)$

The positive and negative preference flows are aggregated into the net preference flow:

$$\phi(a)=\phi^{+}(a)-\phi^{-}(a)$$

Direct consequences of the previous formula are:

$$\phi(a_i) \in [-1;1]$$

$$\sum_{a_i \in A} \phi(a_i)=0$$

The Promethee II complete ranking is obtained by ordering the actions according to the decreasing values of the net flow scores.

=== Unicriterion net flows ===
According to the definition of the multicriteria preference degree, the multicriteria net flow can be disaggregated as follows:

$$\phi(a_i)=\displaystyle\sum_{k=1}^q\phi_{k}(a_i).w_{k}$$

Where:

$$\phi_{k}(a_i)=\frac{1}{n-1}\displaystyle\sum_{a_j
\in
A}\{P_{k}(a_i,a_j)-P_{k}(a_j,a_i)\}$$.

The unicriterion net flow, denoted $\phi_{k}(a_i)\in[-1;1]$, has the same interpretation as the multicriteria net flow $\phi(a_i)$ but is limited to one single criterion. Any action $a_i$ can be characterized by a vector $\vec \phi(a_i) =[\phi_1(a_i),\ldots,\phi_k(a_i),\phi_q(a_i)]$ in a $q$ dimensional space. The GAIA plane is the principal plane obtained by applying a principal components analysis to the set of actions in this space.

=== Promethee preference functions ===
- Usual

$$P_j(d_j)=
\begin{cases}
0 & \text{if } d_j\leq 0 \\[4pt]
1 & \text{if } d_j>0
\end{cases}$$

- U-shape

$$\begin{array}{cc} P_{j}(d_{j})=\left\{
\begin{array}{lll}
0 & \text{if} & |d_{j}| \leq q_{j} \\
\\
1 & \text{if} & |d_{j}| > q_{j}\\
\end{array}
\right.
\end{array}$$

- V-shape

$$\begin{array}{cc} P_{j}(d_{j})=\left\{
\begin{array}{lll}
\frac{|d_{j}|}{p_{j}} & \text{if} & |d_{j}| \leq p_{j} \\
\\
1 & \text{if} & |d_{j}| > p_{j}\\
\end{array}
\right.
\end{array}$$

- Level

$$\begin{array}{cc} P_{j}(d_{j})=\left\{
\begin{array}{lll}
0 & \text{if} & |d_{j}| \leq q_{j} \\
\\
\frac{1}{2} & \text{if} & q_{j}<|d_{j}| \leq p_{j} \\
\\
1 & \text{if} & |d_{j}| > p_{j}\\
\end{array}
\right.
\end{array}$$

- Linear

$$\begin{array}{cc} P_{j}(d_{j})=\left\{
\begin{array}{lll}
0 & \text{if} & |d_{j}| \leq q_{j} \\
\\
\frac{|d_{j}|-q_{j}}{p_{j}-q_{j}} & \text{if} & q_{j}<|d_{j}| \leq p_{j} \\
\\
1 & \text{if} & |d_{j}| > p_{j}\\
\end{array}
\right.
\end{array}$$

- Gaussian

$$P_{j}(d_{j})=1-e^{-\frac{d_{j}^{2}}{2s_{j}^{2}}}$$

== Promethee rankings ==
=== Promethee I ===
Promethee I is a partial ranking of the actions. It is based on the positive and negative flows. It includes preferences, indifferences and incomparabilities (partial preorder).

=== Promethee II ===
Promethee II is a complete ranking of the actions. It is based on the multicriteria net flow. It includes preferences and indifferences (preorder).

== See also ==
- Decision making
- Decision-making software
- D-Sight
- Multi-criteria decision analysis
- Ordinal Priority Approach
- Pairwise comparison
- Preference
