= ÉLECTRE =

Family of multi-criteria decision analysis methods

ÉLECTRE is a family of multi-criteria decision analysis (MCDA) methods that originated in Europe in the mid-1960s. The acronym ÉLECTRE stands for: ÉLimination Et Choix Traduisant la REalité ("Elimination and Choice Translating Reality").

The method was first proposed by Bernard Roy and his colleagues at SEMA consultancy company. A team at SEMA was working on the concrete, multiple criteria, real-world problem of how firms could decide on new activities and had encountered problems using a weighted sum technique. Roy was called in as a consultant and the group devised the ELECTRE method. As it was first applied in 1965, the ELECTRE method was to choose the best action(s) from a given set of actions, but it was soon applied to three main problems: choosing, ranking and sorting. The method became more widely known when a paper by B. Roy appeared in a French operations research journal. It evolved into ELECTRE I (electre one) and the evolutions have continued with ELECTRE II, ELECTRE III, ELECTRE IV, ELECTRE IS and ELECTRE TRI (electre tree), to mention a few. They are used in the fields of business, development, design, and small hydropower.

Roy is widely recognized as the father of the ELECTRE method, which was one of the earliest approaches in what is sometimes known as the French school of decision making. It is usually classified as an "outranking method" of decision making.

There are two main parts to an ELECTRE application: first, the construction of one or several outranking relations, which aims at comparing in a comprehensive way each pair of actions; second, an exploitation procedure that elaborates on the recommendations obtained in the first phase. The nature of the recommendation depends on the problem being addressed: choosing, ranking or sorting.

Criteria in ELECTRE methods have two distinct sets of parameters: the importance coefficients and the veto thresholds. ELECTRE method cannot determine the weights of the criteria. In this regard, it can be combined with other approaches such as Ordinal Priority Approach, Analytic Hierarchy Process, etc.
