= Ordinal priority approach =

Multiple-criteria decision analysis method

Ordinal priority approach (OPA) is a multiple-criteria decision analysis method that aids in solving the group decision-making problems based on preference relations.

== Description ==
Various methods have been proposed to solve multi-criteria decision-making problems. The basis of methods such as analytic hierarchy process and analytic network process is pairwise comparison matrix. The advantages and disadvantages of the pairwise comparison matrix were discussed by Munier and Hontoria in their book. In recent years, the OPA method was proposed to solve the multi-criteria decision-making problems based on the ordinal data instead of using the pairwise comparison matrix. The OPA method is a major part of Dr. Amin Mahmoudi's PhD thesis from the Southeast University of China.

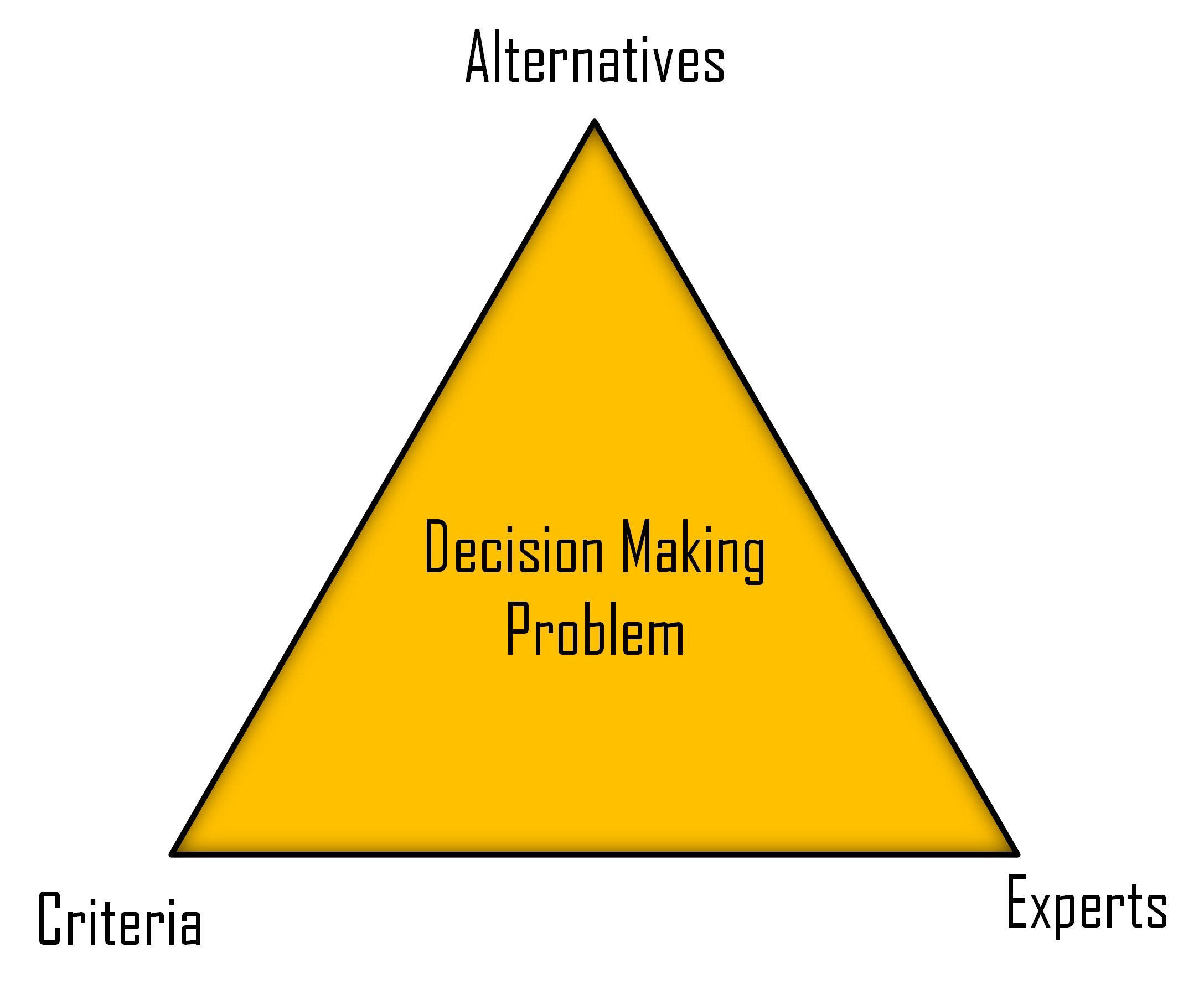
Decision-making components

This method uses linear programming approach to compute the weights of experts, criteria, and alternatives simultaneously. The main reason for using ordinal data in the OPA method is the accessibility and accuracy of the ordinal data compared with exact ratios used in group decision-making problems involved with humans.

In real-world situations, the experts might not have enough knowledge regarding one alternative or criterion. In this case, the input data of the problem is incomplete, which needs to be incorporated into the linear programming of the OPA. To handle the incomplete input data in the OPA method, the constraints related to the criteria or alternatives should be removed from the OPA linear-programming model.

Various types of data normalization methods have been employed in multi-criteria decision-making methods in recent years. Palczewski and Sałabun showed that using various data normalization methods can change the final ranks of the multi-criteria decision-making methods. Javed and colleagues showed that a multiple-criteria decision-making problem can be solved by avoiding the data normalization. There is no need to normalize the preference relations and thus, the OPA method does not require data normalization.

== The OPA method ==
The OPA model is a linear programming model, which can be solved using a simplex algorithm. The steps of this method are as follows:

Step 1: Identifying the experts and determining the preference of experts based on their working experience, educational qualification, etc.

Step 2: identifying the criteria and determining the preference of the criteria by each expert.

Step 3: identifying the alternatives and determining the preference of the alternatives in each criterion by each expert.

Step 4: Constructing the following linear programming model and solving it by an appropriate optimization software such as LINGO, GAMS, MATLAB, etc.

$$\begin{align}
&Max Z \\
&S.t. \\
&Z \leq r_{i}\bigg (r_{j} \big(r_{k} (w_{ijk}^{r_{k}} - w_{ijk}^{{r_{k}}+1}) \big)\bigg) \; \; \; \; \forall i,j \; and \; r_{k} \\
&Z \leq r_{i} r_{j} r_{m} w_{ijk}^{r_{m}} \; \; \; \forall i,j \; and \; r_{m} \\
&\sum_{i=1}^{p}\sum_{j=1}^{n}\sum_{k=1}^{m} w_{ijk} = 1 \\
&w_{ijk}\geq0 \; \; \; \forall i, j \; and \; k  \\
&Z: Unrestricted\;in\;sign \\
\end{align}$$

In the above model, $r_i(i=1,...,p)$ represents the rank of expert $i$, $r_j(j=1...,n)$ represents the rank of criterion $j$, $r_k(k=1...,m)$ represents the rank of alternative $k$, and $w_{ijk}$ represents the weight of alternative $k$ in criterion $j$ by expert $i$. After solving the OPA linear programming model, the weight of each alternative is calculated by the following equation:

$$\begin{aligned}
&w_k=\sum_{i=1}^{p}\sum_{j=1}^{n} w_{ijk}  \; \; \; \; \forall k \\
\end{aligned}$$

The weight of each criterion is calculated by the following equation:

$$\begin{aligned}
&w_j=\sum_{i=1}^{p}\sum_{k=1}^{m} w_{ijk}  \; \; \; \; \forall j \\
\end{aligned}$$

And the weight of each expert is calculated by the following equation:

$$\begin{aligned}
&w_i=\sum_{j=1}^{n}\sum_{k=1}^{m} w_{ijk}  \; \; \; \; \forall i \\
\end{aligned}$$

== Example ==
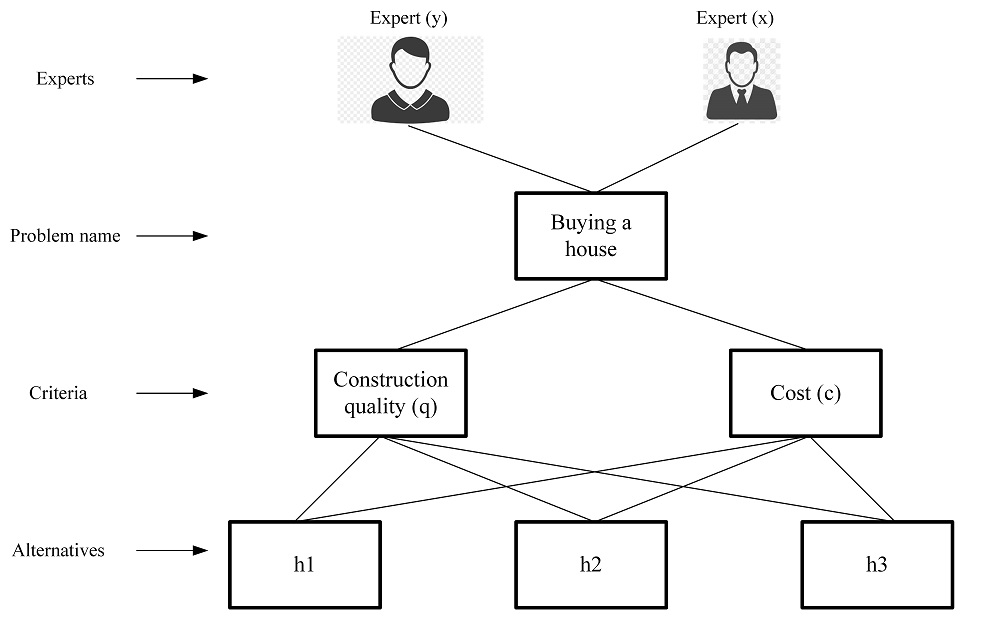
Decision problem of the example

Suppose that we are going to investigate the issue of buying a house. There are two experts in this decision problem. Also, there are two criteria called cost (c), and construction quality (q) for buying the house. On the other hand, there are three houses (h1, h2, h3) for purchasing. The first expert (x) has three years of working experience and the second expert (y) has two years of working experience. The structure of the problem is shown in the figure.

Step 1: The first expert (x) has more experience than expert (y), hence x > y.

Step 2: The criteria and their preference are summarized in the following table:

Experts’ opinions regarding criteria
Criteria	Expert (x)	Expert (y)
c	1	2
q	2	1

Step 3: The alternatives and their preference are summarized in the following table:

Experts' opinions regarding alternatives
Alternatives	Expert (x)		Expert (y)	
Alternatives	c	q	c	q
h1	1	2	1	3
h2	3	1	2	1
h3	2	3	3	2

Step 4: The OPA linear programming model is formed based on the input data as follows:

$$\begin{align}
&Max Z \\
&S.t. \\
&Z \leq 1*1* 1* (w_{xch1} - w_{xch3}) \; \; \; \;  \\
&Z \leq 1*1*2* (w_{xch3} - w_{xch2})\; \; \; \;  \\
&Z \leq 1* 1 *3* w_{xch2} \; \; \; \\
\\
&Z \leq 1*2* 1* (w_{xqh2} - w_{xqh1})  \; \; \; \;  \\
&Z \leq 1*2* 2* (w_{xqh1} - w_{xqh3})  \; \; \; \;  \\
&Z \leq 1* 2 *3* w_{xqh3} \; \; \; \\
\\
&Z \leq 2*2* 1* (w_{ych1} - w_{ych2}) \; \; \; \;  \\
&Z \leq 2*2*2* (w_{ych2} - w_{ych3})\; \; \; \;  \\
&Z \leq 2* 2 *3* w_{ych3} \; \; \; \\
\\
&Z \leq 2*1* 1* (w_{yqh2} - w_{yqh3})  \; \; \; \;  \\
&Z \leq 2*1* 2* (w_{yqh3} - w_{yqh1})  \; \; \; \;  \\
&Z \leq 2* 1 *3* w_{yqh1} \; \; \; \\
\\
&w_{xch1} + w_{xch2} + w_{xch3} + w_{xqh1} + w_{xqh2} + w_{xqh3}+w_{ych1} + w_{ych2} + w_{ych3} + w_{yqh1} + w_{yqh2} + w_{yqh3}= 1 \\
\\
\end{align}$$

After solving the above model using optimization software, the weights of experts, criteria and alternatives are obtained as follows:

$$\begin{align}&w_{x}=w_{xch1} + w_{xch2} + w_{xch3} + w_{xqh1} + w_{xqh2} + w_{xqh3}=0.666667 \\\\&w_{y}=w_{ych1} + w_{ych2} + w_{ych3} + w_{yqh1} + w_{yqh2} + w_{yqh3}=0.333333  \\\\\\&w_{c}=w_{xch1} + w_{xch2} + w_{xch3} + w_{ych1} + w_{ych2} + w_{ych3}=0.555556 \\\\&w_{q}=w_{xqh1} + w_{xqh2} + w_{xqh3} + w_{yqh1} + w_{yqh2} + w_{yqh3}=0.444444 \\\\\\&w_{h1}=w_{xch1} + w_{xqh1} + w_{ych1} + w_{yqh1} = 0.425926 \\\\&w_{h2}=w_{xch2} + w_{xqh2} + w_{ych2} + w_{yqh2} =0.351852 \\\\&w_{h3}=w_{xch3} + w_{xqh3} + w_{ych3} + w_{yqh3} =0.222222\\\\\end{align}$$

Therefore, House 1 (h1) is considered as the best alternative. Moreover, we can understand that criterion cost (c) is more important than criterion construction quality (q). Also, based on the experts' weights, we can understand that expert (x) has a higher impact on final selection compared with expert (y).

== Applications ==
The applications of the OPA method in various field of studies are summarized as follows:

Agriculture, manufacturing, services

- Manufacturing supply chain
- Production strategies
- Production scheduling
- Automotive industry
- Community service demand

Construction industry

- Construction sub-contracting
- Sustainable construction
- Project management

Energy and environment

- Natural resource extraction
- Solar and wind energies
- Low-carbon technologies
- Electrification and emissions
- Circular economy

Healthcare

- COVID-19
- Healthcare supply chain
- Community services

Information technology

- Metaverse
- Autonomous vehicles
- Process control
- Electric vehicles
- Blockchain
- Technology demand

Transportation

- Supply chain management
- Transportation planning
- Traffic control
- Road maintenance

== Extensions ==
Several extensions of the OPA method are listed as follows:

- Grey ordinal priority approach (OPA-G)
- Fuzzy ordinal priority approach (OPA-F)
- Interval ordinal priority approach
- Strict and weak OPA
- Ordinal priority approach under picture fuzzy sets (OPA-P)
- Confidence level measurement in the OPA
- Neutrosophic ordinal priority approach (OPA-N)
- Rough ordinal priority approach
- Robust ordinal priority spproach (OPA-R)
- Hybrid OPA–Fuzzy EDAS
- Hybrid DEA-OPA model
- Hybrid MULTIMOORA-OPA
- Group-weighted ordinal priority approach (GWOPA)

== Software ==
The following non-profit tools are available to solve the MCDM problems using the OPA method:

- Web-based solver
- Excel-based solver
- Lingo-based solver
- Matlab-based solver
