= Stochastic transitivity =

Randomized transitivity in paired comparisons

Stochastic transitivity models are stochastic versions of the transitivity property of binary relations studied in mathematics. Several models of stochastic transitivity exist and have been used to describe the probabilities involved in experiments of paired comparisons, specifically in scenarios where transitivity is expected, however, empirical observations of the binary relation is probabilistic. For example, players' skills in a sport might be expected to be transitive, i.e. "if player A is better than B and B is better than C, then player A must be better than C"; however, in any given match, a weaker player might still end up winning with a positive probability. Tightly matched players might have a higher chance of observing this inversion while players with large differences in their skills might only see these inversions happen seldom. Stochastic transitivity models formalize such relations between the probabilities (e.g. of an outcome of a match) and the underlying transitive relation (e.g. the skills of the players).

A binary relation $\succsim$ on a set $\mathcal{A}$ is called transitive, in the standard non-stochastic sense, if $a \succsim b$ and $b \succsim c$ implies $a \succsim c$ for all members $a,b,c$ of $\mathcal{A}$.

Stochastic versions of transitivity include:

1. Weak Stochastic Transitivity (WST): $\mathbb{P}(a\succsim b)\geq \tfrac{1}{2}$ and $\mathbb{P}(b\succsim c)\geq \tfrac{1}{2}$ implies $\mathbb{P}(a\succsim c)\geq \tfrac{1}{2}$, for all $a,b,c \in \mathcal{A}$;
2. Strong Stochastic Transitivity (SST): $\mathbb{P}(a\succsim b)\geq \tfrac{1}{2}$ and $\mathbb{P}(b\succsim c)\geq \tfrac{1}{2}$ implies $\mathbb{P}(a\succsim c)\geq \max \{\mathbb{P}(a\succsim b),\mathbb{P}(b\succsim c)\}$, for all $a,b,c \in \mathcal{A}$;
3. Linear Stochastic Transitivity (LST): $\mathbb{P}(a\succsim b) = F(\mu(a) - \mu(b))$, for all $a,b \in \mathcal{A}$, where $F:\mathbb{R} \to [0,1]$ is some increasing and symmetric function (called a comparison function), and $\mu: \mathcal{A}\to \mathbb{R}$ is some mapping from the set $\mathcal{A}$ of alternatives to the real line (called a merit function).

== A toy example ==
The marble game - Assume two kids, Billy and Gabriela, collect marbles. Billy collects blue marbles and Gabriela green marbles. When they get together they play a game where they mix all their marbles in a bag and sample one randomly. If the sampled marble is green, then Gabriela wins and if it is blue then Billy wins. If $B$ is the number of blue marbles and $G$ is the number of green marbles in the bag, then the probability $\mathbb{P}(\text{Billy} \succsim \text{Gabriela})$ of Billy winning against Gabriela is

$\mathbb{P}(\text{Billy} \succsim \text{Gabriela}) = \frac{B}{B+G} = \frac{e^{\ln(B)}}{e^{\ln(B)}+e^{\ln(G)}} = \frac{1}{1+e^{\ln(G)-\ln(B)}}$.

In this example, the marble game satisfies linear stochastic transitivity, where the comparison function $F:\mathbb{R} \to [0,1]$ is given by $F(x) = \frac{1}{1+e^{-x }}$ and the merit function $\mu: \mathcal{A}\to \mathbb{R}$ is given by $\mu(M) = \ln(M)$, where $M$ is the number of marbles of the player. This game happens to be an example of a Bradley–Terry model.

== Applications ==
- Ranking and Rating - Stochastic transitivity models have been used as the basis of several ranking and rating methods. Examples include the Elo-Rating system used in chess, go, and other classical sports as well as Microsoft's TrueSkill used for the Xbox gaming platform.
- Models of Psychology and Rationality - Thurstonian models (see Case 5 in law of comparative judgement), Fechnerian models and also Luce's choice axiom are theories that have foundations on the mathematics of stochastic transitivity. Also, models of rational choice theory are based on the assumption of transitivity of preferences (see Von Neumann's utility and Debreu's Theorems), these preferences, however, are often revealed with noise in a stochastic manner.
- Machine Learning and Artificial Intelligence (see Learn to Rank) - While Elo and TrueSkill rely on specific LST models, machine learning models have been developed to rank without prior knowledge of the underlying stochastic transitivity model or under weaker than usual assumptions on the stochastic transitivity. Learning from paired comparisons is also of interest since it allows for AI agents to learn the underlying preferences of other agents.
- Game Theory - Fairness of random knockout tournaments is strongly dependent on the underlying stochastic transitivity model. Social choice theory also has foundations that depend on stochastic transitivity models.

== Connections between models ==
Positive Results:

1. Every model that satisfies Linear Stochastic Transitivity must also satisfy Strong Stochastic Transitivity, which in turn must satisfy Weak Stochastic Transitivity. This is represented as: LST $\implies$ SST$\implies$WST ;
2. Since the Bradley-Terry models and Thurstone's Case V model are LST models, they also satisfy SST and WST;
3. Due to the convenience of more structured models, a few authors have identified axiomatic justifications of linear stochastic transitivity (and other models), most notably Gérard Debreu showed that: Quadruple Condition + Continuity $\implies$ LST (see also Debreu Theorems);
4. Two LST models given by invertible comparison functions $F(x)$ and $G(x)$ are equivalent if and only if $F(x) = G(\kappa x)$for some $\kappa \geq 0.$

Negative Results:

1. Stochastic transitivity models are empirically unverifiable, however, they may be falsifiable;
2. Distinguishing between LST comparison functions $F(x)$ and $G(x)$ can be impossible even if an infinite amount of data is provided over a finite number of points;
3. The estimation problem for WST, SST and LST models are in general NP-Hard, however, near optimal polynomially computable estimation procedures are known for SST and LST models.

== See also ==
- Nontransitive game
- Decision theory
- Utilitarianism
