= Thurstone Personality Schedule =

Type of personality test

The Thurstone Personality Schedule was one of the first personality tests. It was published by Louis Leon Thurstone and Thelma Gwinn Thurstone in 1930. It underwent many revisions and adaptions.

6 year test-retest reliability was 0.53 in one study.

In 1952 around 200 firms used the test for personnel screening.
