= Regents examinations =

New York State high school tests

Regents examinations are a series of statewide, end-of-course standardized tests administered by the New York State Education Department (NYSED) under the authority of the Board of Regents of the University of the State of New York. New York high school students have historically been required to pass five of these exams (in English language arts, mathematics, science, and social studies) to earn a Regents Diploma, the standard credential for high school graduation in the state. A more demanding Regents Diploma with Advanced Designation is also available, as are local diploma options for certain students with disabilities. Scores are reported on a 0–100 scale, with 65 the standard passing mark. Following a multiyear review by a state-appointed commission, the Board of Regents voted in November 2024 to phase out the exams as a graduation requirement, with the change taking effect for the 2027–28 school year.

Each exam is developed by a committee of New York teachers in the relevant subject, who draft a test map from the state's learning standards over a cycle that typically spans three years from initial design to administration. Exams are offered in January, June, and August, with June serving as the primary sitting for most subjects. Raw scores are converted to scale scores through a statistical equating process that is recalibrated for each administration, with conversion charts published alongside answer keys by NYSED.

The examination system originated in 1865, when the Board of Regents introduced preliminary exams as a basis for distributing state funds to secondary academies. High school end-of-course exams followed in 1878, beginning with five subjects: algebra, American history, Latin, natural philosophy, and physical geography. The program expanded considerably through the twentieth century and was substantially reformed in the 1990s, when Commissioner Richard Mills made the Regents Diploma the sole standard diploma for most students by phasing out the less rigorous local diploma option. Further revision came with the adoption of Common Core standards in the 2010s, a period marked by significant public backlash and a growing parental opt-out movement, before most exam administrations were cancelled during the COVID-19 pandemic.

== History of exams ==
The first Regents examinations were administered in November 1866. In 1878, the Regents Examination system was expanded to assess the curricula taught in the secondary schools of New York, and the Regents exams were first administered as high school end-of-course exams. From the original five exams (algebra, Latin, American History, natural philosophy [science], natural geography), the State Education Department expanded the Regents exams offerings to forty-two tests in 1879; tests were administered in November, February, and June. In 1901, Regents exams were given in rhetoric, civics, economics, Caesar, Virgil, Xenophon, and physiology.

Throughout the 1920s and into the 1930s vocational education Regents exams were approved and administered. These included but were not limited to, agricultural science, costume draping, and salesmanship. By 1970 the number and types of Regents exams changed to reflect the changes in high school curriculum: vocational exams were discontinued, and the sheer number of exams were either dropped or consolidated as the curricular emphasis trended toward comprehensive examinations rather than the singularly focused tests of the past. This trend continued into the twenty-first century, with the cancellation of foreign language exams in 2010 and 2011.

In 1979, Regents Competency Tests were introduced for all students. In order to graduate, students had to pass the RCT OR the Regents exam. Later, they were offered only to students with disabilities. They were discontinued after the class of 2015. In 2000, New York State Alternative Assessments (NYSAA) program was first administered allowing students with severe cognitive disabilities to complete a datafolio-style assessment to demonstrate their performance toward achieving the New York State learning standards.

The Latin, German, Greek, and Hebrew language exams were removed after the 2009–10 school year, and the remaining language exams (Italian, Spanish, and French) were removed after the 2010–11 school year. Previously, a Regents foreign language exam was an option that would allow for Regents Exam with Advanced Designation. Currently, local school districts can develop their own exams to assess foreign language competency and allow for students to meet the Advanced Designation requirement.

The June 2020, August 2020, and January 2021, then later, August 2021 and January 2022 exams were not administered as a result of the coronavirus pandemic. Only four of the ten exams were administered in June 2021.

== Active exams and composition ==
Most Regents exams consist of a single three-hour testing period. The exception is the Earth Science exam, which consists of a 41-minute (approximate) laboratory component, known as the Earth Science lab practical, given around two weeks prior to the three-hour exam. The Regents exams are administered in January, June, and August.

The Chemistry, Earth Science, and Physics examinations are currently labeled as part of the "Physical Setting" of science. However, all of the exams will soon be renamed and modified in realignment to the NYS Next Generation Learning Standards (NGLS). This rollout began with the Algebra I exam in June 2024, then Geometry, Earth and Space Sciences, and Life Science: Biology in June 2025, followed by Algebra II, Chemistry, Physics, and English Language Arts in June 2026.

Active exams and composition (Note: As of 2023.)
Exam	Part I	Part II	Part III	Part IV	Citations
Algebra I	24 multiple-choice questions	6 open-ended questions	4 open-ended questions	1 open-ended question	
Algebra II	24 multiple-choice questions	8 open-ended questions	4 open-ended questions	1 open-ended question	
Chemistry	30 multiple-choice questions	Mix of 35 multiple-choice and open-ended questions	20 open-ended questions	(Note: This exam is only 3 parts.)	
Earth Science	35 multiple-choice questions	15 multiple-choice and 15 open-ended questions	20 open-ended questions		
English Language Arts	24 multiple-choice questions	Source-based argument essay	Text-analysis response		
Geometry	24 multiple-choice questions	7 open-ended questions	3 open-ended questions	1 open-ended question	
Global History and Geography II	28 multiple-choice questions in chronological order from earliest to latest	2 sets of constructive-response questions, 3 questions in each set	1 essay question based on five documents.		
Living Environment	30 multiple-choice questions	Mix of 25 multiple-choice and open-ended questions	17 open-ended questions	Mix of 13 multiple-choice and open-ended questions	
Physics	35 multiple-choice questions	15 multiple-choice and 15 open-ended questions	20 open-ended questions		
United States History and Government (Framework)	28 multiple-choice questions in chronological order from earliest to latest	2 short-essay questions	6 document-based questions and 1 essay question		

NGLS Examinations and compositions
Exam	Amount of Clusters	Amount of Questions	Citations
Life Science: Biology	9-11	Mix of 45-55 multiple-choice and open-ended questions	
Earth & Space Sciences	9-11	Mix of 45-55 multiple-choice and open-ended questions	
Chemistry	9-11	Mix of 45-55 multiple-choice and open-ended questions	
Physics	Unknown	Unknown	

=== Interpreting scores ===
A score of 85-100 is considered a Level 5, a score of 76-84 is considered a Level 4, a score of 65-75 is considered a Level 3, a 55-64 is considered a Level 2, and below a 55 is considered a Level 1 (failing).

=== Score appeals ===
Examination scores can be appealed to the local Superintendent or leader of the school district and regraded at a new location. A student can appeal no more than two of their scores.

== Changes ==
=== 2000s ===
In 2005, the Board of Regents began modifying the mathematics curriculum. An integrated approach that taught topics in geometry and algebra during each of three years, with exams like “Math A” and “Math B” normally taken after a year and a half and again after three years, was replaced by a curriculum that divides topics into Algebra I, Geometry, and Algebra II. Each of these take the form of a one-year course with a Regents Examination at the end of the year.

The format of the laboratory practical for Earth Science was changed in 2008. Currently, it consists of three sections, each with a time limit of nine minutes. While administering the test, there are multiple stations for each section. Each station uses different data, but the same task. For example, each section 1 station may have different rocks and minerals, though the task is the same.

=== 2010s ===
In 2010, German, Latin, and Hebrew Regents foreign language exams were cancelled, and students studying those languages are now allowed to take a locally developed examination to demonstrate competency. On May 16, 2011, in the face of an $8 million budget gap, the remaining foreign language exams (French, Italian, and Spanish) were eliminated, although districts may administer locally developed foreign language exams to let students attain a Regents Diploma with Advanced Designation.

In addition, all tests administered during the month of January were to be canceled. In August 2011, New York City Mayor Michael Bloomberg and five private donors contributed funds to ensure that the Regents was administered in January 2012.

Regent scores are invalid for students that need three or fewer points to pass and are from schools that are viewed as struggling; such students can move on to next course without a regent score.

Beginning in January 2011, the English Language Arts exam was reduced from a six-hour exam to a three-hour exam. The exam still contains essay components, but has greater emphasis on reading comprehension and less on writing.

Students graduating in 2012 (who were 9th grade students in 2008) were the first cohort of students required to take all five Regents exams with a passing score of 65 and obtain a Regents Diploma to graduate. Previously, school districts had been permitted to offer a Local Diploma, with less stringent requirements than the Regents Diploma. Requirements have gradually been increased in recent years.

Test security procedures were heightened in response to the Stuyvesant High School cheating scandal. Effective August 2012, test proctors must collect and hold electronic devices for the duration of the exams; students are no longer permitted to have these devices on or near them. Previously, possession of electronic devices was allowed as long as they were not in use.

The Regents exams in English Language Arts and Algebra I were changed to incorporate the Common Core Standards starting in June 2014. In June 2015, the Regents Exam in Geometry was aligned with CCLS. Additionally, in June 2016, Algebra II was aligned with CCLS as well. High school students will be allowed to continue graduating with minimum scores of 65 on state exams until 2022. At that point, required scores would rise to 75 for the English Language Arts exam and 80 in algebra—levels deemed evidence of readiness for college.

In 2015, New York began administering computer-based standardized tests.

In August 2017, the Board of Regents approved changes to the Global History and Geography exam. Instead of a comprehensive examination that covers material from two years, the new exam will cover information taught only in the 10th grade (1750–present). The new exam will also have a revised format: instead of 50 multiple choice questions, there will be only 30, but they will still be worth 55% of the grade. The thematic essay and document based question remain unchanged.

=== 2020s ===
Due to the COVID-19 pandemic, the Board of Regents cancelled all Regents examinations in the state of New York for June 2020, August 2020, and January 2021.

Also as a result of the COVID-19 pandemic, the Board of Regents voted for a plan on March 15, 2021 to make the Regents exams not required for high school diplomas in the 2020-2021 school year. They also voted to administer only four of the ten Regents examinations in June; Algebra I, Earth Science, English Language Arts, and Living Environment; as well as cancelling the August exams altogether. The board of regents also voted for a plan to allow scores of at least 50 become passing starting 2021 and ending 2023. This still meets the federal criteria. The Board of Regents originally sent a testing waiver request to the United States Department of Education, however they indicated they are not willing to give out waivers and that schools must still meet the requirements. The US History and Government: Framework Regents scheduled for June 2022 was canceled due to a mass shooting in Buffalo, NY, and a new version of the examination was offered beginning in June 2023.

Beginning in January 2023, schools in New York City were no longer required to send their students' Regents examinations to another location for scoring; instead, they could be graded in-house. The Department of Education cited the previous policy on sending Regents exams to other schools as burdensome.

In November 2024, the Board of Regents announced that it would no longer mandate Regents exams as a condition for graduation beginning with the 2027-28 school year. In July 2025, the Board of Regents voted to approve a new system, known as "portrait of a graduate", to define graduation requirements.

=== Proposals ===
- In April 2012, the Board of Regents decided to formally consider a proposal that would eliminate Regents Examination in Global History and Geography as a graduation requirement for some students beginning September 2013. Global History and Geography is the most frequently failed examination. Under the proposal, students would be able to substitute a second Regents Exam in math or science or a vocational exam for this requirement. Another proposal under consideration would keep the Global History and Geography requirement, but split the test into two separate tests, one on Global History and another on Global Geography. NYSED accepts public comment and will provide a formal proposal to the Board of Regents. That proposal had to be approved by the Board of Regents before the exam requirements can be changed. The proposal had since been denied.
- There has been serious discussion in New York about the cancellation of the Regents exams. In the fall of 2019, the Board of Regents opened a commission to potentially eliminate the exams as a high school graduation requirement. Originally slated for as soon as fall 2020, the commission was placed on hold due to the COVID-19 pandemic.

== Exam requirements ==
Students must achieve a score of 65 or higher on Regents exams to earn a Regents diploma. Students with disabilities utilizing the low pass (55 or higher) and other safety net options graduate with a local diploma. NYSED considers a score of 75 to 80 to indicate college readiness, with a score of 75 to 85 being a minimum for admission to some selective colleges and universities and a score below 75 being a threshold for placement in remediation for some schools, including SUNY and CUNY schools. In May 2022, the Regents announced a special appeal for the following examination periods: June 2022, August 2022, January 2023, June 2023, or August 2023. This special appeal is available to all students and allows a student to appeal an earned score of 50-64 on any Regents examination taken during one of the approved examination periods.

=== Regents Diploma ===
In 2014, the Board of Regents created the 4+1 option, where students must pass at least 4 regents exams—one per subject—and pass one additional approved pathway option.

Students must score 65 or higher in English Language Arts, one mathematics exam, one science exam, one social studies exam, and one more exam of their choice.

Students may also appeal one Regents examination in the score band of 60-64 and graduate with a Regents diploma. They must meet the appeal requirements.

=== Regents Diploma with Advanced Designation ===
Advanced and Honors designations are available for exemplary students. In addition to the Regents exam requirements, there are additional requirements for attaining a Regents or Regents with Advanced Designation Diploma, which are described in a NYSED handout titled "General Education & Diploma Requirements", and are codified in Section 100.5 of the Part 100 Regulations of the Commissioner of Education.

Students must score 65 or higher in English Language Arts, all three mathematics exams, two science exams, two social studies exams, and a locally-developed foreign language checkpoint exam which serves as the culmination of a student's six-credit sequence in a language other than English.

=== Additional honors designations ===
The New York State Board of Regents offers additional recognition to students with exemplary exam performance:

- A student who earns an average score of 90 or higher (without rounding) on required exams is eligible for Honors designation on their diploma.

If the student is pursuing the Advanced Regents Diploma, they also may qualify for the following honors:

- A student who earns scores of 85 or higher on all of the required mathematics Regents examinations is eligible for an annotation on their diploma that states that the student has mastery in mathematics.
- A student who earns scores of 85 or higher on at least three science Regents examinations is eligible for an annotation on their diploma that states that the student has mastery in science.

=== Scoring the Regents ===
The scores reported for regents exams are not a sum or percentage of questions answered correctly. Instead, raw scores on the tests are converted on a curve to the officially reported scale scores. This curve is customized to each year's group of tests. For example, for the Regents Examination in Algebra I given January 2019, a raw score on the test of 27 points (out of 86; so, 31% correct) would be given a scaled score of 65, that is, considered "proficient" for the purposes of being awarded the Regents Diploma.

== Exemptions and other circumstances ==
=== Disabilities ===
Students with disabilities participate in the general education curriculum, leading to a diploma. Students with individualized education plans, students with 504 plans (if documented on their plan), and students declassified in 8th grade or later and identified to remain eligible for safety nets at their declassification meeting, are eligible for safety nets on the Regents examinations. Students who utilize the safety net options (low pass, low pass appeal, and compensatory option) graduate with a local diploma.

Students with severe disabilities who meet the eligibility requirements do not take Regents exams and participate in alternate assessment, a computer based tested program individualized to their needs.

=== Local Diploma requirements and information ===
Local Diplomas are offered by New York State school districts for students with disabilities who are eligible for the safety nets, for students who are English Language Learners that utilize the ELA appeal, and for general education students who successfully appeal two Regents examinations in the score band of 60-64.

Similar to the Regents diploma, the local diploma is recognized as a high school diploma, which would allow the student to attend college, enroll in the military, and have jobs that require a high school diploma. All students with disabilities must still have the appropriate number of credits to graduate.

The safety nets for students with disabilities include:

· Low Pass option: Which students must earn at least 55–64 on a required Regents exam to qualify for a local diploma. Students who score 52–54 can appeal up to two exams with this score band.

· Compensatory option: Students who score 45–54 on a required Regents exam, but scores 65 or higher on another regents exam is able to compensate the 45–54 score using the 65+ score. The compensatory option may not be used to compensate the English Language Arts or math regents exams, but the student may use the English Language Arts and math regents to compensate another regents exam scored 45–54 as long as they scored 65 or higher.

=== Graduation without examination ===
During the 1990s, some alternative assessment schools were founded in parts of New York in an attempt to provide a way for students to graduate from high school without taking any Regents exams. Usually, the substitute graduation assessment consisted of a review and grading, by a panel of teachers, of an academic portfolio – a collection of the student's best work from all his or her years at the school. From such a "portfolio examination" would be issued a "Regents equivalency" grade for the areas of Math, English, History, and Science, and a "Regents Equivalency" diploma would be awarded to the student at commencement. Students enrolled in these schools do, however, take the English Language Arts Regents exam as a part of the New York State school accountability system.

=== Private schools ===
Though all public schools are required to follow either the Regents Exam system or some form of alternative assessment, private schools need not. The vast majority of private schools do use Regents exams and award Regents diplomas, but some, usually academically prestigious private schools, do not. These schools' argument is that their own diploma requirements exceed Regents standards. Schools run by the Society of Jesus, such as Canisius High School, Fordham Prep, McQuaid Jesuit, Regis and Xavier, and by the Society of Mary (Marianists), such as Chaminade and Kellenberg, have not used Regents exams for decades. The Masters School, The Ursuline School, The Hackley School, The Harvey School, Long Island Lutheran Middle & High School, Manlius Pebble Hill School, and Nichols School also do not use the Regents system.

=== Multiple Pathways ===
Some Advanced Placement exams, International Baccalaureate exams, SAT subject tests (Note: SAT subject tests were discontinued by the College Board in January 2021.), Career and Technical Education exams, and the Career Development and Occupational Studies Commencement Credential are recognized by NYSED as multiple pathway options.

=== Examination in middle school ===
Some middle schools in New York offer accelerated Honors programs that allow students to take the Algebra I, U.S. History & Government, Earth Science, and/or Living Environment Regents exams in a June examination of seventh or eighth grade.
