= Ken Pomeroy (statistician) =

American sports statistician

- Education: Virginia Tech (BS); University of Wyoming (MS)
- Occupations: College basketball statistician, columnist
- Years active: 2002–present
- Known for: KenPom ratings
- Website: kenpom.com

Ken Pomeroy is an American statistician in the field of advanced basketball statistics. He is the creator of the college basketball website and statistical archive KenPom, which includes his College Basketball Ratings, statistics for every NCAA men's Division I basketball team, archives dating back to the 2002 season, and a blog about college basketball. His work on tempo-based basketball statistics is compared by many to the work of Bill James in baseball. As of 2012, Pomeroy was also an instructor of atmospheric sciences at the University of Utah.

Pomeroy earned his undergraduate degree at Virginia Tech, and received a graduate degree in atmospheric science from Wyoming. After working as a meteorologist for the U.S. government, he quit that job to focus full-time on his website. He previously worked with the Houston Rockets, teaming up with general manager Daryl Morey, a noted user of advanced statistics.

Pomeroy has written articles in The New York Times, ESPN.com, and Sports Illustrated. He was a co-author of The 2008-09 College Basketball Prospectus and has been an author for the past four years.

== Kenpom.com ==
Pomeroy's website has helped explain basketball on a possession by possession level. His peers have taken to calling him "Doctor Po-Po." As well as maintaining and calculating a variety of statistics on his website, including tempo-free statistics, Pomeroy also maintains data on non-numeric factors such as offensive and defensive style of play. One such measure that Pomeroy uses is called log5, a proprietary blend of data for projecting the likelihood of teams advancing in conference and national tournaments. The equations for Pomeroy's log5 projections were originally created by Bill James.

Throughout the season, Pomeroy continually updates his KenPom ratings for all 365 Division I men's basketball programs with metrics such as offensive and defensive efficiency, tempo, and pace. Although his site was more of a personal venture when it was founded, Pomeroy's research is used by numerous college basketball teams in an attempt to gain a competitive advantage.

The accuracy of Pomeroy's rankings in predicting game outcomes has been noted by popular newspapers and blogs such as FiveThirtyEight, Mediaite, and The Wall Street Journal.

Syracuse head basketball coach Jim Boeheim mentioned Pomeroy in a press conference rant about analytics on February 20, 2020, mistakenly attributing his consternation about certain stats to Pomeroy.

== Personal life ==
Pomeroy graduated from West Potomac High School in Alexandria, Virginia in 1991. In 2017, he was a resident of Salt Lake City.
