= Bernreuter Personality Inventory =

Personality test created by Robert G. Bernreuter

The Bernreuter Personality Inventory is a personality test developed by Robert G. Bernreuter in 1931 measuring general personality. It is sometimes cited as the first multi-scale personality questionnaire.

== Overview ==
The test consists of 125 yes or no question which yield six scores: neurotic tendency, self-sufficiency, introversion-extraversion, dominance-submission, sociability, and confidence. A 1936 survey of members of the American Psychological Association found that the Bernreuter Personality Inventory was the most well known psychological test.

== Application ==
The inventory became widely used quickly after it was first published, but also attracted many critics who questioned its usefulness and theoretical basis. The test was sold by the Stanford University Press, priced at $1.75 for 25 administrations. The test incorporated questions from the Thurstone Personality Schedule and others.

The test was originally developed with four scales (neurotic tendency, self-sufficiency, introversion-extraversion, dominance-submission) chosen with items chosen logically. The other two scales (sociability, and confidence) came from a factor analysis by John C. Flanagan. The "Flanagan keys" eventually were incorporated into the published version of the test.
