= Ralph A. Bradley =

Canadian-American statistician (1923-2001)

Ralph Allan Bradley (November 28, 1923 – October 30, 2001) was a Canadian-American statistician and statistics educator, whose research lay in the fields of design of experiments, nonparametric statistics, sequential analysis, and multivariate analysis. He is known for the Bradley–Terry model in pairwise comparison and for founding the Department of Statistics at Florida State University.

== Education and career ==
Bradley was born in Smiths Falls, Ontario, Canada and grew up in Wellington, Ontario. He studied mathematics and physics at Queen's University, receiving an honors degree in 1944. After a stint in the Canadian Army, he returned to Queen's University and obtained an MA in 1946. He received his PhD in theoretical statistics in 1949 at the University of North Carolina at Chapel Hill under the supervision of Harold Hotelling.

Bradley was employed at McGill University from 1949 to 1950 and as a faculty member at Virginia Tech from 1950 to 1958. In 1959, he moved to Florida State University to found the Department of Statistics there and stayed on until 1978 as the head of the department. In 1982, he moved to the University of Georgia as Research Professor of Statistics. Bradley retired from the University of Georgia in 1992. He continued to participate in research activities afterward and was named professor emeritus at both Florida State University and the University of Georgia.

== Honors and awards ==
Bradley was editor of the journal Biometrics from 1957 to 1962. He was Vice-President from 1975 to 1978 and President in 1981 of the American Statistical Association. Bradley was a Fellow of the American Statistical Association and a Fellow of the Institute of Mathematical Statistics. The statistics department of the University of Georgia organizes an annual lecture in his name. In 1992 Bradley was awarded the American Statistical Association's Founders Award.
