= Alternative assessment =

Alternative assessment is also known under various other terms, including:

- authentic assessment
- integrative assessment
- holistic assessment

In education, "alternative assessment" is in direct contrast to what is known as "traditional testing" "traditional assessment," or "standardized assessment."

Instead of traditional selected-response or constructed-response tests that look for discrete facts or knowledge students recall in a standard way, students can apply knowledge in alternative, novel ways. Writing poetry in a language arts class, performing in a play in a theatre class or a mock-trial in a government class are alternative assessments. These performances are assessed with rubrics, which are also used to give feedback to students and stakeholders.

Alternative assessment is sometimes used as a substitute for certain students who are unable, generally because of disabilities, to take the one given to most students.

Initially, alternative assessments are typically formative. Portfolio assessments compile multiple alternative assessments collected formatively during the course and turn them into an overview for summative assessment at the end of the course.

Portfolio Assessment as Alternative Assessment:

Portfolios can be organized by developmental category, content area, or by topics or themes. Portfolios have three main purposes. One is for assessment and evaluation, assessing progress, achievement, developmental strengths, and areas for continued work. Another purpose is for self-assessment and reflection, where students can chart their progress and take ownership of their learning. Finally, portfolios can be used as a means for reporting progress, in which progress and achievement can be shown to parents.

The type of portfolio used depends on the purpose and what it will be used for. A working portfolio is used to collect samples of student work for future evaluation. Samples are collected by students and teachers without making final decisions as to what will be kept or discarded. Later, these items can become part of another type of portfolio. In an evaluative portfolio, the teacher uses the materials included to complete both formative and summative evaluation of progress. This is not a full collection of all work, but a definitive collection to show mastery of skills in an area. A showcase portfolio is used to exhibit a child's best work, chosen by the child. Often, a showcase portfolio may be used as a way to share accomplishments with parents. Finally, an archival portfolio follows a student over time. These show a history of student work that follows from class to class. An archival portfolio can pass along information about the student from one teacher to another as well as allow a student to look back at his or her own progress.

In the model, students, teachers, and sometimes parents select pieces from a student's combined work over the (usually four) years of school to demonstrate that learning and improvement has taken place over those years. Some of the characteristics of a portfolio assessment is that it emphasizes and evidences the learning process as an active demonstration of knowledge. It is used for evaluating learning processes and learning outcomes. Alternative assessments are used to encourage student involvement in their assessment, their interaction with other students, teachers, parents and the larger community.

== Notable practitioners ==
- Giselle O. Martin-Kniep
- E-scape project from TERU, Goldsmiths

== See also ==
- Adaptive comparative judgement
- Concept inventory
- Standardized assessment
