= Polynomial conjoint measurement =

Polynomial conjoint measurement is an extension of the theory of conjoint measurement to three or more attributes. It was initially developed by the mathematical psychologists David Krantz (1968) and Amos Tversky (1967). The theory was given a comprehensive mathematical exposition in the first volume of Foundations of Measurement (Krantz, Luce, Suppes & Tversky, 1971), which Krantz and Tversky wrote in collaboration with the mathematical psychologist R. Duncan Luce and philosopher Patrick Suppes. Krantz & Tversky (1971) also published a non-technical paper on polynomial conjoint measurement for behavioural scientists in the journal Psychological Review.

As with the theory of conjoint measurement, the significance of polynomial conjoint measurement lies in the quantification of natural attributes in the absence of concatenation operations. Polynomial conjoint measurement differs from the two attribute case discovered by Luce & Tukey (1964) in that more complex composition rules are involved.

== Polynomial conjoint measurement ==
=== Krantz's (1968) schema ===
Most scientific theories involve more than just two attributes; and thus the two variable case of conjoint measurement has rather limited scope. Moreover, contrary to the theory of n – component conjoint measurement, many attributes are non-additive compositions of other attributes (Krantz, et al., 1971). Krantz (1968) proposed a general schema to ascertain the sufficient set of cancellation axioms for a class of polynomial combination rules he called simple polynomials. The formal definition of this schema given by Krantz, et al., (1971, p. 328) is as follows.

Let $Y =\big\{y_1, y_2, \ldots, y_n \big\}$. The set $S\left(Y\right)$ is the smallest set of simple polynomials such that:

- $y_i \in S\left(Y\right), i = 1,\ldots, n$;
- $Y_1, Y_2 \subset Y$ such that $Y_1 \cap Y_2 = \varnothing, G_1 \in S\left(Y_1\right)$ and $G_2 \in S\left(Y_2\right)$, then $G_1 + G_2\,$ and $G_1 G_2\,$ are in $S\left(Y\right)$.

Informally, the schema argues: a) single attributes are simple polynomials; b) if G_{1} and G_{2} are simple polynomials that are disjoint (i.e. have no attributes in common), then G_{1} + G_{2} and G_{1} $\times$ G_{2} are simple polynomials; and c) no polynomials are simple except as given by a) and b).

Let A, P and U be single disjoint attributes. From Krantz’s (1968) schema it follows that four classes of simple polynomials in three variables exist which contain a total of eight simple polynomials:

- Additive: $A + P + U\,$;
- Distributive: $\left(A + P\right)U\,$; plus 2 others obtained by interchanging A, P and U;
- Dual distributive: $A P + U\,$ plus 2 others as per above;
- Multiplicative: $A P U\,$.

Krantz’s (1968) schema can be used to construct simple polynomials of greater numbers of attributes. For example, if D is a single variable disjoint to A, B, and C then three classes of simple polynomials in four variables are A + B + C + D, D + (B + AC) and D + ABC. This procedure can be employed for any finite number of variables. A simple test is that a simple polynomial can be ‘split’ into either a product or sum of two smaller, disjoint simple polynomials. These polynomials can be further ‘split’ until single variables are obtained. An expression not amenable to ‘splitting’ in this manner is not a simple polynomial (e.g. AB + BC + AC (Krantz & Tversky, 1971)).

=== Axioms ===
Let $A = \big\{a, b, c, \ldots \big\}$, $P = \big\{p, q, r, \ldots \big\}$ and $U = \big\{u, v, w, \ldots \big\}$ be non-empty and disjoint sets. Let " $\succsim$ " be a simple order. Krantz et al. (1971) argued the quadruple $Z = \langle A, P, U, \succsim \rangle$ is a polynomial conjoint system if and only if the following axioms hold.

- WEAK ORDER.
- SINGLE CANCELLATION. The relation " $\succsim$ " satisfies single cancellation upon A whenever $\left(a, p, u\right)\succsim \left(b, p, u\right)$ if and only if $\left(a, q, v\right)\succsim \left(b, q, v\right)$ holds for all $a, b \in A; p, q \in P$ and $u, v \in U$. Single cancellation upon P and U is similarly defined.
- DOUBLE CANCELLATION. The relation " $\succsim$ " upon $A \times P$ satisfies double cancellation if and only if for all $a, b, c \in A$ and $p, q, r \in P$, $\left(a, q, u\right)\succsim \left(b, p, u\right)$ and $\left(b, r, u\right)\succsim \left(c, q, u\right)$ therefore $\left(a, r, u\right)\succsim \left(c, p, u\right)$ is true for all $u \in U$. The condition holds similarly upon $A \times U$ and $U \times P$.
- JOINT SINGLE CANCELLATION. The relation " $\succsim$ " upon $A \times P$ satisfies joint single cancellation such that $\left(a, p, u\right)\succsim \left(b, q, u\right)$ if and only if $\left(a, p, v\right)\succsim \left(b, q, v\right)$ is true for all $a, b \in A; p, q \in P$ and $u, v \in U$. Joint independence is similarly defined for $A \times U$ and $U \times P$.
- DISTRIBUTIVE CANCELLATION. Distributive cancellation holds upon $A \times P \times U$ if and only if $\left(a, p, u\right)\succsim \left(c, r, v\right)$, $\left(b, q, u\right)\succsim \left(d, s, v\right)$ and $\left(d, r, v\right)\succsim \left(b, p, u\right)$ implies $\left(a, q, u\right)\succsim \left(c, s, v\right)$ is true for all $a, b, c, d\in A; p, q, r, s \in P$ and $u, v\in U$.
- DUAL DISTRIBUTIVE CANCELLATION. Dual distributive cancellation holds upon $A \times P \times U$ if and only if

$\left(a, r, w\right)\succsim \left(c, s, v\right)$, $\left(d, p, u\right)\succsim \left(b, t, x\right)$, $\left(d, r, x\right)\succsim \left(e, s, u\right)$ and $\left(c, t, y\right)\succsim \left(d, q, y\right)$ implies $\left(a, p, v\right)\succsim \left(b, q, w\right)$ is true for all $a, b, c, d, e\in A; p, q, r, s, t \in P$ and $u, v, w, x, y\in U$.

- SOLVABILITY. The relation " $\succsim$ " upon $A \times P \times U$ is solvable if and only if for all $a, b\in A; p, q \in P$ and $u, v \in U$, there exists $c \in A; r \in P$ and $w \in U$ such that $a \sim \left(b, q, w\right) \sim \left(b, r, v\right) \sim \left(c, q, v\right)$.
- ARCHIMEDEAN CONDITION.

=== Representation theorems ===
The quadruple $Z = \langle A, P, U, \succsim \rangle$ falls into one class of three variable simple polynomials by virtue of the joint single cancellation axiom.
