= Robert G. Bernreuter =

American psychologist

Robert Gibbon Bernreuter (1901–1995) was an American psychologist. In 1931 he developed the Bernreuter Personality Inventory.

He was born in 1901 in Tampico, Illinois.

He received his Ph.D. from Stanford University in 1931, for his thesis he developed the Bernreuter Personality Inventory. He worked at Pennsylvania State University from 1931 to his retirement in 1966.

He married Shirley Buell (1902-2005) of Howard, Pennsylvania in 1931.

He died June 15, 1995.
