= Giselle O. Martin-Kniep =

American educator (1956–2021)

Giselle O. Martin-Kniep (born 1956, died 2021) was an American educator, researcher, program evaluator and writer.

According to her own LinkedIn page, she did her master's degree in International Development, doing her thesis field work in Mexico. She also gained a Ph.D. in education and political science at Stanford Graduate School of Education. After 13 years at Stanford University, she moved to New York City where she served on the faculty at Adelphi University.

She was also with the University of British Columbia and the University of Victoria.

Later, she started and was president of her own company, Learner-Centered Initiatives. Also, she was CEO of Communities for Learning: Leading Lasting Change, previously called the Center for the Study of Expertise in Teaching and Learning, Martin-Kniep worked with hundreds of schools and districts nationally and internationally in the areas of alternative assessment, standards-based design, school improvement and action research.

In the fall of 2021, she wrote of being diagnosed with acute myeloid leukemia and died a few months later.

== Publications ==
- Diane Cunningham, Giselle Martin-Kniep and Diana Muxworth Feige (1998). Why Am I Doing This: Purposeful Teaching with Portfolio Assessment. Heinemann.
- Giselle Martin-Kniep (1999). Capturing the Wisdom of Practice: Portfolios for Teachers and Administrators. Association for Supervision and Curriculum Development.
- Giselle Martin-Kniep (2005). Becoming a Better Teacher: Eight Innovations that Work. Pearson, Association for Supervision and Curriculum Development.
