= Thurstonian model =

Stochastic transitivity mathematical model

A Thurstonian model is a stochastic transitivity model with latent variables for describing the mapping of some continuous scale onto discrete, possibly ordered categories of response. In the model, each of these categories of response corresponds to a latent variable whose value is drawn from a normal distribution, independently of the other response variables and with constant variance.

Developments over the last two decades, however, have led to Thurstonian models that allow unequal variance and non zero covariance terms. Thurstonian models have been used as an alternative to generalized linear models in analysis of sensory discrimination tasks. They have also been used to model long-term memory in ranking tasks of ordered alternatives, such as the order of the amendments to the US Constitution. Their main advantage over other models ranking tasks is that they account for non-independence of alternatives.

Ennis provides a comprehensive account of the derivation of Thurstonian models for a wide variety of behavioral tasks including preferential choice, ratings, triads, tetrads, dual pair, same-different and degree of difference, ranks, first-last choice, and applicability scoring. In Chapter 7 of this book, a closed form expression, derived in 1988, is given for a Euclidean-Gaussian similarity model that provides a solution to the well-known problem that many Thurstonian models are computationally complex often involving multiple integration. In Chapter 10, a simple form for ranking tasks is presented that only involves the product of univariate normal distribution functions and includes rank-induced dependency parameters. A theorem is proven that shows that the particular form of the dependency parameters provides the only way that this simplification is possible. Chapter 6 links discrimination, identification and preferential choice through a common multivariate model in the form of weighted sums of central F distribution functions and allows a general variance-covariance matrix for the items.

== Definition ==
Consider a set of m options that has been ranked by n independent judges. Such a ranking can be represented by the ordering vector r_{n} = (r_{n1}, r_{n2},...,r_{nm}).

The observed rankings are assumed to be derived from real-valued latent variables z_{ij}, representing the evaluation of option j by judge i. Rankings r_{i} are derived deterministically from z_{i} such that z_{i}(r_{i1}) < z_{i}(r_{i2}) < ... < z_{i}(r_{im}).

The z_{i} are assumed to be derived from an underlying ground truth value μ for each option. In the most general case, they are multivariate-normal:

$$\mathbf{z}_j\ \sim\ \mathcal{N}(\mathbf{\mu}_j, \mathbf{\Sigma}_j)$$

One common simplification is to assume an isotropic Gaussian distribution, with a single standard deviation parameter for each judge:

$$\mathbf{z}_j\ \sim\ \mathcal{N}(\mathbf{\mu}_j, \sigma_i^2 \mathbf{I}).$$

== Inference ==
The Gibbs-sampler based approach to estimating model parameters is due to Yao and Bockenholt (1999).

- Step 1: Given β, Σ, and r_{i}, sample z_{i}.

The z_{ij} must be sampled from a truncated multivariate normal distribution to preserve their rank ordering. Hajivassiliou's Truncated Multivariate Normal Gibbs sampler can be used to sample efficiently.

- Step 2: Given Σ, z_{i}, sample β.

β is sampled from a normal distribution:

$$\beta\ \sim\ \mathcal{N}(\beta^*, \Sigma^*).$$

where β^{*} and Σ^{*} are the current estimates for the means and covariance matrices.

- Step 3: Given β, z_{i}, sample Σ.

Σ^{−1} is sampled from a Wishart posterior, combining a Wishart prior with the data likelihood from the samples ε_{i} =z_{i} - β.

Now return to step 1.

== History ==
Thurstonian models were introduced by Louis Leon Thurstone to describe the law of comparative judgment. Prior to 1999, Thurstonian models were rarely used for modeling tasks involving more than 4 options because of the high-dimensional integration required to estimate parameters of the model. In 1999, Yao and Bockenholt introduced their Gibbs-sampler based approach to estimating model parameters. This comment, however, only applies to ranking and Thurstonian models with a much broader range of applications were developed prior to 1999. For instance, a multivariate Thurstonian model for preferential choice with a general variance-covariance structure is discussed in chapter 6 of Ennis (2016) that was based on papers published in 1993 and 1994. Even earlier, a closed form for a Thurstonian multivariate model of similarity with arbitrary covariance matrices was published in 1988 as discussed in Chapter 7 of Ennis (2016). This model has numerous applications and is not limited to any particular number of items or individuals.

== Applications to sensory discrimination ==
Thurstonian models have been applied to a range of sensory discrimination tasks, including auditory, taste, and olfactory discrimination, to estimate sensory distance between stimuli that range along some sensory continuum.

The Thurstonian approach motivated Frijter (1979)'s explanation of Gridgeman's Paradox, also known as the paradox of discriminatory nondiscriminators: People perform better in a three-alternative forced choice task when told in advance which dimension of the stimulus to attend to. (For example, people are better at identifying which of one three drinks is different from the other two when told in advance that the difference will be in degree of sweetness.) This result is accounted for by differing cognitive strategies: when the relevant dimension is known in advance, people can estimate values along that particular dimension. When the relevant dimension is not known in advance, they must rely on a more general, multi-dimensional measure of sensory distance.

The above paragraph contains a common misunderstanding of the Thurstonian resolution of Gridgeman's paradox. Although it is true that different decision rules (cognitive strategies) are used in making a choice among three alternatives, the mere fact of knowing an attribute in advance does not explain the paradox, nor are subjects required to rely on a more general, multidimensional measure of sensory difference. In the triangular method, for instance, the subject is instructed to choose the most different of three items, two of which are putatively identical. The items may differ on a unidimensional scale and the subject may be made aware of the nature of the scale in advance. Gridgeman's paradox will still be observed. This occurs because of the sampling process combined with a distance-based decision rule as opposed to a magnitude-based decision rule assumed to model the results of the 3-alternative forced choice task.

== See also ==
- Thurstone scale
- Bradley-Terry Model
- Stochastic Transitivity
