= Thelma Thurstone =

American Psychologist

Thelma Gwinn Thurstone
- Born: December 11, 1897; Hume, Missouri, U.S.
- Died: February 12, 1993 (aged 95); Chapel Hill, North Carolina, U.S.
- Education: University of Chicago; Carnegie Institute of Technology; University of Missouri
- Known for: Psychological Testing
- Scientific career
- Fields: Psychology
- Institutions: University of North Carolina at Chapel Hill
- Doctoral advisor: Louis Leon Thurstone

Thelma Gwinn Thurstone (December 11, 1897 – February 12, 1993) was an American psychologist.

== Career ==
After obtaining her master's degree in 1923, Thurstone worked for a year at the Institute for Government Research in Washington, D.C. before moving to Chicago where she worked as a statistician and created psychological tests for the American Council on Education (ACE). Simultaneously, she worked on a doctorate on the topic of test theory, which was submitted in 1926. She then worked with her husband, Louis Leon Thurstone, to create tests for the ACE, write articles and book, and at the Psychometric Laboratory.

In 1948, Thurstone began work as the full-time director of the Division of Child Study for Chicago's public schools. Thelma and Louis moved to North Carolina in 1950, where Thelma accepted a position at the University of North Carolina as a professor in the Department of Education. Following the death of her husband in 1955, Thurstone took over as director of the L. L. Thurstone Psychometric Laboratory for two years. Thurston continued her life-time work in curriculum development and test development that she began in Chicago as part of the Frank Porter Graham Child Development Center at UNC, with Science Research Associates as her publisher, until she retired at the age of 85. Much of her curriculum materials were based on the multi-factor theory of intelligence developed by her and L.L. Thurstone and covered instructional materials covering a range from preschool through high school. Her "Reading for Understanding" materials were organized by ascending difficulty using multiple factor analysis to train students in reading comprehension across a range of difficulty encompassing early grades through high-school. Her curriculum materials were sold and used throughout the English-speaking world, and a small part of the early learning materials were translated into French for use in Canada. In 1979 she was awarded an honorary degree from the University of North Carolina at Chapel Hill.

== Personal life ==
Thurstone was born in Hume, Missouri, the eldest of three children, to parents who were both teachers. She attended the University of Missouri, graduating with a baccalaureate degree in German in 1917, before earning a second degree in education. Thurstone went on to complete a master's degree in psychology in 1923 from the Carnegie Institute of Technology.

Thurstone married Louis Leon Thurstone in 1924 who, in his autobiography, described Thelma as a "genius in test construction". The couple had three children, born between 1927 and 1932.

== Research publications ==
- Thurstone, Louis Leon, and Thelma Gwinn Thurstone. "Factorial studies of intelligence." Psychometric monographs (1941).
