= R. Duncan Luce =

American mathematician and cognitive scientist (1925–2012)

Robert Duncan Luce
- Born: May 16, 1925
- Died: August 11, 2012 (aged 87)
- Education: MIT (B.S) (1945); MIT (PhD) (1950)
- Known for: Luce's choice axiom Clique; Social dynamics Semiorder; Theory of conjoint measurement
- Awards: National Medal of Science (2003)
- Scientific career
- Fields: Mathematical psychology Mathematician; Cognitive science
- Workplaces: Columbia University; Harvard University; University of Pennsylvania; University of California, Irvine
- Doctoral advisor: Irvin Cohen

Robert Duncan Luce (May 16, 1925 – August 11, 2012) was an American mathematician and social scientist, and one of the most preeminent figures in the field of mathematical psychology. At the end of his life, he held the position of Distinguished Research Professor of Cognitive Science at the University of California, Irvine.

== Education and career ==
Luce received a Bachelor of Science degree in Aeronautical Engineering from the Massachusetts Institute of Technology in 1945, and PhD in Mathematics from the same university in 1950 under Irvin S. Cohen with thesis On Semigroups.

He began his professorial career at Columbia University in 1954, where he was an assistant professor in mathematical statistics and sociology. Following a lecturership at Harvard University from 1957 to 1959, he became a professor at the University of Pennsylvania in 1959, and was awarded the Benjamin Franklin Professorship of Psychology in 1968. After visiting the Institute for Advanced Study beginning in 1969, he joined the UC Irvine faculty in 1972, but returned to Harvard in 1976 as Alfred North Whitehead Professor of Psychology and then later as Victor S. Thomas Professor of Psychology. In 1988 Luce rejoined the UC Irvine faculty as Distinguished Professor of Cognitive Sciences and (from 1988 to 1998) director of UCI's Institute for Mathematical Behavioral Sciences.

== Contributions ==
Contributions for which Luce is known include formulating Luce's choice axiom formalizing the principle that additional options should not affect the probability of selecting one item over another, defining semiorders, introducing graph-theoretic methods into the social sciences, and coining the term "clique" for a complete subgraph in graph theory.

== Recognition ==
In 1966, Luce was elected to the American Academy of Arts and Sciences. Luce was elected to the National Academy of Sciences in 1972 for his work on fundamental measurement, utility theory, global psychophysics, and mathematical behavioral sciences. He received the 2003 National Medal of Science in behavioral and social science for his contributions to the field of mathematical psychology. In 2004, he was elected to the American Philosophical Society.

== Books by Luce ==
- Luce, R. Duncan; Raiffa, Howard (1957). Games and decisions: introduction and critical survey. New York: Wiley. MR 0087572. Paperback reprint, Dover, New York
- Luce, R. Duncan (1959). Individual choice behavior: a theoretical analysis. New York: Wiley.
- Luce, R. Duncan (1960). "Response latencies and probabilities". In Arrow, Kenneth J.; Karlin, Samuel; Suppes, Patrick (eds.). Mathematical models in the social sciences, 1959: Proceedings of the first Stanford symposium. Stanford mathematical studies in the social sciences. Vol. IV. Stanford, California: Stanford University Press. pp. 298–311. ISBN 9780804700214.
- Luce, R. Duncan (1986). Response times: their role in inferring elementary mental organization. New York: Oxford.
