= Luce's choice axiom =

Axiom in probability theory

In probability theory, Luce's choice axiom states that the relative odds of selecting one item over another from a pool of many items are not affected by the presence or absence of other items in the pool. Selection of this kind is said to have "independence from irrelevant alternatives" (IIA). It was formulated by R. Duncan Luce in 1959.

== Overview ==
Consider a set $X$ of possible outcomes, and consider a selection rule such that for any $a\in A \subset X$ with $A$ a finite set, the selector selects $a$ from $A$ with probability $P(a \mid A)$.

Luce proposed two choice axioms. The first one is usually called "independence from irrelevant alternatives" (IIA), and the second one is usually referred to as "Luce's choice axiom".

1. Independence of irrelevant alternatives (IIA):
  For any $a, b \in B \subset A$, if $P(a\mid A) = 0, P(b\mid A) > 0$, then we still have $P(a\mid B) = 0$.
2. Path independence:
  For any $a \in B \subset A$,
  $$P(a \mid A) = P(a\mid B)\sum_{b\in B}P(b\mid A)$$

Note that IIA implies path independence.

=== Matching law formulation ===
Define the matching law selection rule $P(a\mid A) = \frac{u(a)}{\sum_{a'\in A} u(a')}$, for some "value" function $u: A \to (0, \infty)$. This is sometimes called the softmax function, or the Boltzmann distribution.

Theorem: Any matching law selection rule satisfies Luce's choice axiom. Conversely, if $P(a\mid A)> 0$ for all $a\in A \subset X$, then Luce's choice axiom implies that it is a matching law selection rule.

== Applications ==
In econometrics and marketing science, this axiom provides the theoretical foundation for models that calculate a consumer's probability of choosing one brand over another based on its utility.

In behavioral psychology, it is used to model response behavior in the form of matching law.

In cognitive science, it is used to model approximately rational decision processes.

== Sources ==
- Guadagni, Peter M.; Little, John D. C. (1982). A logit model of brand choice calibrated on scanner data. Cambridge, Mass.: Alfred P. Sloan School of Management, Massachusetts Institute of Technology.
