= Pairwise comparison (psychology) =

Process of comparing two entities to determine preference

Pairwise comparison generally is any process of comparing entities in pairs to judge which of each entity is preferred, or has a greater amount of some quantitative property, or whether or not the two entities are identical. The method of pairwise comparison is used in the scientific study of preferences, attitudes, voting systems, social choice, public choice, requirements engineering and multiagent AI systems. In psychology literature, it is often referred to as paired comparison.

Prominent psychometrician L. L. Thurstone first introduced a scientific approach to using pairwise comparisons for measurement in 1927, which he referred to as the law of comparative judgment. Thurstone linked this approach to psychophysical theory developed by Ernst Heinrich Weber and Gustav Fechner. Thurstone demonstrated that the method can be used to order items along a dimension such as preference or importance using an interval-type scale.

Mathematician Ernst Zermelo (1929) first described a model for pairwise comparisons for chess ranking in incomplete tournaments, which serves as the basis (even though not credited for a while) for methods such as the Elo rating system and is equivalent to the Bradley–Terry model that was proposed in 1952.

== Overview ==
If an individual or organization expresses a preference between two mutually distinct alternatives, this preference can be expressed as a pairwise comparison. If the two alternatives are x and y, the following are the possible pairwise comparisons:

The agent prefers x over y: "x > y" or "xPy"

The agent prefers y over x: "y > x" or "yPx"

The agent is indifferent between both alternatives: "x = y" or "xIy"

== Probabilistic models ==
In terms of modern psychometric theory probabilistic models, which include Thurstone's approach (also called the law of comparative judgment), the Bradley–Terry–Luce (BTL) model, and general stochastic transitivity models, are more aptly regarded as measurement models. The Bradley–Terry–Luce (BTL) model is often applied to pairwise comparison data to scale preferences. The BTL model is identical to Thurstone's model if the simple logistic function is used. Thurstone used the normal distribution in applications of the model. The simple logistic function varies by less than 0.01 from the cumulative normal ogive across the range, given an arbitrary scale factor.

In the BTL model, the probability that object j is judged to have more of an attribute than object i is:

$$\Pr \{X_{ji}=1\} =\frac{e^{{\delta_j} - {\delta_i}}}{1 + e^{{\delta_j} - {\delta_i}}}
= \sigma (\delta_j - \delta_i),$$

where $\delta_i$ is the scale location of object $i$; $\sigma$ is the logistic function (the inverse of the logit). For example, the scale location might represent the perceived quality of a product, or the perceived weight of an object.

The BTL model, the Thurstonian model as well as the Rasch model for measurement are all closely related and belong to the same class of stochastic transitivity.

Thurstone used the method of pairwise comparisons as an approach to measuring perceived intensity of physical stimuli, attitudes, preferences, choices, and values. He also studied implications of the theory he developed for opinion polls and political voting (Thurstone, 1959).

== Transitivity ==
For a given decision agent, if the information, objective, and alternatives used by the agent remain constant, then it is generally assumed that pairwise comparisons over those alternatives by the decision agent are transitive. Most agree upon what transitivity is, though there is debate about the transitivity of indifference. The rules of transitivity are as follows for a given decision agent.

- If xPy and yPz, then xPz
- If xPy and yIz, then xPz
- If xIy and yPz, then xPz
- If xIy and yIz, then xIz

This corresponds to (xPy or xIy) being a total preorder, P being the corresponding strict weak order, and I being the corresponding equivalence relation.

Probabilistic models also give rise to stochastic variants of transitivity, all of which can be verified to satisfy (non-stochastic) transitivity within the bounds of errors of estimates of scale locations of entities. Thus, decisions need not be deterministically transitive in order to apply probabilistic models. However, transitivity will generally hold for a large number of comparisons if models such as the BTL can be effectively applied.

Using a transitivity test one can investigate whether a data set of pairwise comparisons contains a higher degree of transitivity than expected by chance.

== Argument for intransitivity of indifference ==
Some contend that indifference is not transitive. Consider the following example. Suppose you like apples and you prefer apples that are larger. Now suppose there exists an apple A, an apple B, and an apple C which have identical intrinsic characteristics except for the following. Suppose B is larger than A, but it is not discernible without an extremely sensitive scale. Further suppose C is larger than B, but this also is not discernible without an extremely sensitive scale. However, the difference in sizes between apples A and C is large enough that you can discern that C is larger than A without a sensitive scale. In psychophysical terms, the size difference between A and C is above the just noticeable difference ('jnd') while the size differences between A and B and B and C are below the jnd.

You are confronted with the three apples in pairs without the benefit of a sensitive scale. Therefore, when presented A and B alone, you are indifferent between apple A and apple B; and you are indifferent between apple B and apple C when presented B and C alone. However, when the pair A and C are shown, you prefer C over A.

== Preference orders ==
If pairwise comparisons are in fact transitive in respect to the four mentioned rules, then pairwise comparisons for a list of alternatives (A_{1}, A_{2}, A_{3}, ..., A_{n−1}, and A_{n}) can take the form:

A_{1}(>XOR=)A_{2}(>XOR=)A_{3}(>XOR=) ... (>XOR=)A_{n−1}(>XOR=)A_{n}

For example, if there are three alternatives a, b, and c, then the possible preference orders are:

- $a>b>c$
- $a>c>b$
- $b>a>c$
- $b>c>a$
- $c>a>b$
- $c>b>a$
- $a>b=c$
- $b=c>a$
- $b>a=c$
- $a=c>b$
- $c>a=b$
- $a=b>c$
- $a=b=c$

If the number of alternatives is n, and indifference is not allowed, then the number of possible preference orders for any given n-value is n!. If indifference is allowed, then the number of possible preference orders is the number of total preorders. It can be expressed as a function of n:

$$\sum_{k=1}^n k! S_2(n,k),$$

where S_{2}(n, k) is the Stirling number of the second kind.

== Applications ==
One important application of pairwise comparisons is the widely used Analytic Hierarchy Process, a structured technique for helping people deal with complex decisions. It uses pairwise comparisons of tangible and intangible factors to construct ratio scales that are useful in making important decisions.

Another important application is the Potentially All Pairwise RanKings of all possible Alternatives (PAPRIKA) method. The method involves the decision-maker repeatedly pairwise comparing and ranking alternatives defined on two criteria or attributes at a time and involving a trade-off, and then, if the decision-maker chooses to continue, pairwise comparisons of alternatives defined on successively more criteria. From the pairwise rankings, the relative importance of the criteria to the decision-maker, represented as weights, is determined.

== See also ==
- Analytic Hierarchy Process (AHP)
- Law of comparative judgment
- Potentially all pairwise rankings of all possible alternatives (PAPRIKA) method
- PROMETHEE pairwise comparison method
- Preference (economics)
- Stochastic Transitivity
- Condorcet method
- Ranking (information retrieval)
- Sorting algorithm
