= Louis Leon Thurstone =

American psychologist and scholar (1887–1955)

- Born: May 29, 1887; Chicago, Illinois, U.S.
- Died: September 29, 1955 (aged 68); Chapel Hill, North Carolina, U.S.
- Education: Cornell University (MS); University of Chicago (PhD)
- Known for: Multiple factor analysis Intelligence testing Law of comparative judgment Thurstonian model
- Spouse: Thelma Thurstone
- Scientific career
- Fields: Psychometrics
- Workplaces: University of Chicago; L. L. Thurstone Psychometric Laboratory (University of North Carolina)
- Doctoral advisor: James Angell
- Doctoral students: Ledyard Tucker
- Other notable students: James Watson

Louis Leon Thurstone (May 29, 1887 – September 29, 1955) was an American psychologist who pioneered the fields of psychometrics and psychophysics. He conceived the approach to measurement known as the law of comparative judgment, and is well known for his contributions to factor analysis. A Review of General Psychology survey, published in 2002, ranked Thurstone as the 88th most cited psychologist of the 20th century, tied with John Garcia, James J. Gibson, David Rumelhart, Margaret Floy Washburn, and Robert S. Woodworth.

== Early life and career ==
Thurstone was born in Chicago, Illinois, to Swedish immigrant parents. His family returned to Stockholm, Sweden, when he was eight years old, before returning to the United States in 1901, settling in Jamestown, New York. Thurstone originally received a master's degree in mechanical engineering from Cornell University in 1912. Thurstone was offered a brief assistantship in the laboratory of Thomas Edison. In 1914, after two years as an instructor of geometry and drafting at the University of Minnesota, he enrolled as a graduate student in psychology at the University of Chicago (PhD, 1917). He later returned to the University of Chicago (1924–1952) where he taught and conducted research; among his students was James Watson, who co-discovered the structure of DNA. 1952, he established the L. L. Thurstone Psychometric Laboratory at the University of North Carolina at Chapel Hill.

== Factor analysis and work on intelligence ==
Thurstone was responsible for the standardized mean and standard deviation of IQ scores used today, as opposed to the Intelligence Test system originally used by Alfred Binet. He is also known for the development of the Thurstone scale.

Thurstone's work in factor analysis led him to formulate a model of intelligence centered on "Primary Mental Abilities" (PMAs), which were independent group factors of intelligence that different individuals possessed in varying degrees. He opposed the notion of a singular general intelligence that factored into the scores of all psychometric tests and was expressed as a mental age. In 1935 Thurstone, together with EL Thorndike and JP Guilford, founded the journal Psychometrika and also the Psychometric Society, going on to become the society's first president in 1936. Thurstone's contributions to methods of factor analysis have proved valuable in establishing and verifying later psychometric factor structures, and have influenced the hierarchical models of intelligence in use in intelligence tests such as WAIS and the modern Stanford-Binet IQ test.

The seven primary mental abilities in Thurstone's model were verbal comprehension, word fluency, number facility, spatial visualization, associative memory, perceptual speed, and reasoning.

== Contributions to measurement ==
Despite his contributions to factor analysis, Thurstone (1959, p. 267) cautioned: "When a problem is so involved that no rational formulation is available, then some quantification is still possible by the coefficients of correlation of contingency and the like. But such statistical procedures constitute an acknowledgement of failure to rationalize the problem and to establish functions that underlie the data. We want to measure the separation between the two opinions on the attitude continuum and we want to test the validity of the assumed continuum by means of its internal consistency". Thurstone's approach to measurement was termed the law of comparative judgment. He applied the approach in psychophysics, and later to the measurement of psychological values. The so-called 'Law', which can be regarded as a measurement model, involves subjects making a comparison between each of a number of pairs of stimuli with respect to magnitude of a property, attribute, or attitude. Methods based on the approach to measurement can be used to estimate such scale values.

Thurstone's Law of comparative judgment has important links to modern approaches to social and psychological measurement. In particular, the approach bears a close conceptual relation to the Rasch model (Andrich, 1978), although Thurstone typically employed the normal distribution in applications of the Law of comparative judgment whereas the Rasch model is a simple logistic function. Thurstone anticipated a key epistemological requirement of measurement later articulated by Rasch, which is that relative scale locations must 'transcend' the group measured; i.e. scale locations must be invariant to (or independent of) the particular group of persons instrumental to comparisons between the stimuli. Thurstone (1929) also articulated what he referred to as the additivity criterion for scale differences, a criterion which must be satisfied in order to obtain interval-level measurements.

== Awards and honors ==
Thurstone received numerous awards, including: Best Article, American Psychological Association (1949); Centennial Award, Northwestern University (1951); Honorary Doctorate, University of Gothenburg (1954). Thurstone was President of American Psychological Association (1933) and first President of the American Psychometric Society (1936). He was elected to the American Academy of Arts and Sciences in 1937, the United States National Academy of Sciences in 1938, and the American Philosophical Society in 1938.

== Selected works ==
- The Nature of Intelligence (London: Routledge. 1924)
- The Effect of Motion Pictures on the Social Attitudes of High School Children Ruth C. Peterson & L.L. Thurstone, MacMillan, 1932
- Motion Pictures and the Social Attitudes of Children Ruth C. Peterson & L.L. Thurstone, MacMillan, 1933
- The Vectors of Mind. Address of the president before the American Psychological Association, Chicago meeting, September, 1933 ( Psychological Review, 41, 1–32. 1934)
- The Vectors of Mind (Chicago, IL, US: University of Chicago Press 1935)
- Primary mental abilities (Chicago: University of Chicago Press. 1938)
- Multiple-Factor Analysis (Chicago: University of Chicago Press. 1947)
- The Fundamentals of Statistics (MacMillan: Norwood Press. 1925)

== See also ==
- L. L. Thurstone Psychometric Laboratory
- Law of comparative judgment

== Sources ==
- Martin, O (1997). "Psychological measurement from Binet to Thurstone, (1900–1930)". Revue de Synthèse (in French). 118 (4): 457–93. doi:10.1007/BF03181359. PMID 11625304.
- Thurstone, LL (1987). "Psychophysical analysis. by L. L. Thurstone, 1927" (PDF). The American Journal of Psychology. 100 (3–4): 587–609. doi:10.2307/1422696. JSTOR 1422696. PMID 3322058.
- Gulliksen, H (1968). "Louis Leon Thurstone, experimental and mathematical psychologist". The American Psychologist. 23 (11): 786–802. doi:10.1037/h0026696. PMID 4881041.
- Wolfle, D (1956). "Louis Leon Thurstone, 1887–1955". The American Journal of Psychology. 69 (1): 131–4. PMID 13302517.
- Horst, P (1955). "L.L. Thurstone and the science of human behavior". Science. 122 (3183): 1259–60. Bibcode:1955Sci...122.1259H. doi:10.1126/science.122.3183.1259. PMID 13274085.
- Andrich, D. (1978). "Relationships Between the Thurstone and Rasch Approaches to Item Scaling". Applied Psychological Measurement. 2 (3): 451–462. doi:10.1177/014662167800200319. S2CID 120407672.
- Thurstone, L. L. (1927). "A law of comparative judgement". Psychological Review. 34 (4): 278–286. doi:10.1037/h0070288. S2CID 144782881.
- Gordon, Kate; Smith, Thomas Vernor, eds. (1929). Essays in Philosophy: by Seventeen Doctors of Philosophy of the University of Chicago. Chicago: Open Court. OCLC 257229209.
- Thurstone, L. L. (1974). "The Measurement of Values". Psychological Review. 61 (1). Chicago: The University of Chicago Press: 47–58. doi:10.1037/h0060035. ISBN 978-0-226-80114-8. OCLC 5723850. PMID 13134416.
