= Decision quality =

Quality of a decision in the moment

Decision quality (DQ) is the quality of a decision at the moment the decision is made, regardless of its outcome. Decision quality concepts permit the assurance of both effectiveness and efficiency in analyzing decision problems. In that sense, decision quality can be seen as an extension to decision analysis. Decision quality also describes the process that leads to a high-quality decision. Properly implemented, the DQ process enables capturing maximum value in uncertain and complex scenarios.

== Decision ==
A decision is a choice between two or more alternatives that involves an irrevocable allocation of resources. Ronald A. Howard and Ali E. Abbas note that a mental commitment or intention is not a decision. They write:

You can say that you have decided to diet, but you will not have made a decision until you do not order your customary dessert at a meal. Even if you abandon your diet tomorrow, today's meals are different.

The roots of the word "decision" are consistent with this interpretation. The Latin word corresponding to decide means "to cut off." As long as you are just thinking about the decision, you are not cutting off anything except the time you might have spent doing something else. As soon as you sign the contract, choose not to faster your seatbelt before driving, or start down the expert-rated ski trail, you have cut off some possible futures and created the possibility of others. As a radio commentator once said, "The past is a canceled check and you have no claim on the future."

As we have seen, the resource allocation of a decision can be irrevocable in whole or in part. For example, if you are merely thinking about where to spend your vacation, you have not yet made a decision. Time spent is irrevocable at the current level of science, so while thinking about your vacation you have indeed decided to spend some time, you have not yet committed monetary resources. You make a decision when you book the tickets, make the hotel reservations, and thereby commit some resources that are at least partially irrevocable due to fees for cancellation or change.

The moment of decision is the moment when changing your mind costs something. If, in anger, you write an email to your boss saying you quit, your moment of decision is when you hit "send." Up until that moment, you can change your mind with little consequence. Once you hit "send," however, you begin a chain of events that will be difficult, if not impossible, to reverse.

== Decision and outcome ==
Fundamental to all decision quality concepts is the distinction between the decision and its outcome. They are different because of the uncertainties when making a choice—a high-quality decision can still result in a poor outcome, and vice versa. In the face of uncertainty, the decision maker only has control over the decision, but no control over the outcome of external circumstances. Consequently, the outcome of a decision does not allow an assessment of its quality. A decision has quality at the time it is made, which is not changed by hindsight. Concepts of decision quality focus on measuring and improving the quality of the decision at the time it is being made.

== Elements ==
The confidence a decision maker has in its choice, and related to it the commitment a decision maker has to act upon that choice, depends on the quality of the decision at the time of making the decision. A high-quality decision is characterized by the following elements:

- A useful frame
- Feasible and diverse alternatives
- Meaningful and reliable information
- Clear values, preferences, and trade-offs
- Logically sound reasoning
- Commitment to action

Quality in decision making requires quality in each of the elements listed above, and the overall quality of the decision is limited by the weakest element. Decision quality is achieved when for each element the cost to obtain additional information or insight to improve its quality exceeds the added value.

A variety of specific tools and processes exist to improve the quality of each element.

=== Framing ===
The first element to achieve decision quality is framing. Having the appropriate frame ensures the right decision problem is addressed. Quality in framing is achieved when the decision makers have alignment on purpose, perspective, and scope of the decision problem to be solved. It means the right people will work the right problem the right way.

=== Options ===
A decision cannot be better than the best available alternative (or option if there is more than one). A wide variety of approaches, tools, and methods exist to generate high quality options, ranging from systematic search approaches to identify options to approaches that aim to creatively synthesize options. Quality in options is achieved by applying a suitable options generation process, where the process itself leads to a variety of feasible and diverse options, which are hybrid solutions of originally considered options that combine their best features, and where for each options an understanding of its implementation exists.

=== Information ===
The quality of a decision depends on the quality of the information to inform the decision. Quality in information is achieved when the information is meaningful and reliable, is based on appropriate data and judgment, reflects properly all uncertainties, biases, intangibles, and interdependencies, and the limits to the information are known. A wide variety of tools exist to improve the quality of the information used in the decision problem.

=== Values and trade-offs ===
Quality in this element requires the identification of the right decision criteria and the definition of trade-off rules among them. This necessitates at first the identification of all key stakeholders, and what each of them values. Quality in this element of decision quality is characterized by transparent value metrics, a clear line of sight of the primary metric, and explicit trade-off rules between key metrics.

=== Sound reasoning ===
This element is the domain of decision analysis, which aims to produce insight. Decision analysis provides the logic and analytic tools to find the best choice in a complex situation and should serve as a guide to facilitate the conversation about the decision. A wide variety of tools, ranging from decision trees, over hierarchies to complex network models is available to match the decision problem. Quality in this element is achieved when the value and uncertainty of each alternative are understood, and the best choice is clear.

=== Commitment to action ===
The quality of a decision also depends on the commitment to act upon the choice that is made. Quality in this element is achieved by involving all key decision-makers and stakeholders in an effective and efficient decision-making process. At the end of the process, quality is characterized by buy-in across all stakeholders and an organization that is ready to take action and commit resources.

== History and industry implementation ==
Decision quality concepts were first developed in 1964, building on developments in statistical decision theory and game theory by Professor Howard Raiffa of Harvard University, and dynamic probabilistic systems by Professor Ronald A. Howard of Stanford University. The First implementation of DA/DQ concepts in a professional application is documented in Prof. Howard's paper "Decision Analysis: Applied Decision Theory." published in 1966. Since then, decision analysis tools and decision quality concepts have been adopted by many corporations to guide and improve their decisions. Starting in 2014, the Society of Decision Professionals is recognizing organizations that made DQ a core competency across the entire organization with the Raiffa-Howard Award, presented annually. Beyond organization-wide implementation, decision quality concepts can also be applied on multi-company projects.

== See also ==
- Decision analysis
- Decision engineering
- Decision-making
- Decision model
- Decision theory
- Decision tree
- Decision support
- Influence diagram
