= Decision analysis cycle =

The decision analysis (DA) cycle is the top-level procedure for carrying out a decision analysis. Decision analysis (DA) is the discipline comprising the philosophy, methodology, and professional practice necessary to address important decisions in a formal manner.

The traditional decision analysis cycle consists of four phases:

- basis development
- deterministic sensitivity analysis
- probabilistic analysis
- basis appraisal.

The diagram below depicts the decision analysis cycle:

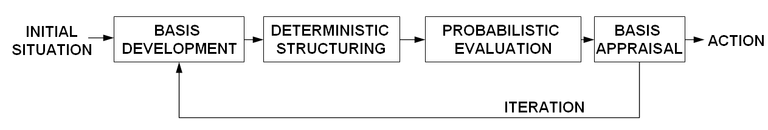

A revised form of the cycle consists of an attention-focusing method followed by a decision method, each of which is composed of three stages:

- formulation
- evaluation
- appraisal.

== See also ==
- Decision model
- Decision theory
- Enterprise decision management
