= Intelligence engine =

Enterprise information management system

An intelligence engine is a type of enterprise information management that combines business rule management, predictive, and prescriptive analytics to form a unified information access platform that provides real-time intelligence through search technologies, dashboards and/or existing business infrastructure. Intelligence Engines are process and/or business problem specific, resulting in industry and/or function-specific marketing trademarks associated with them. They can be differentiated from enterprise resource planning (ERP) software in that intelligence engines include organization-level business rules and proactive decision management functionality.

== History ==
The first intelligence engine application appears to have been introduced in 2001 by Sonus Networks, Inc. in their patent US6961334 B1. Applied to the field of telecommunications systems, the intelligence engine was composed of a database queried by a data distributor layer, received by a telephony management layer and acted upon by a facility management command & control layer. This combined standalone business intelligence tools like a data warehouse, reporting and querying software and a decision support system.

The concept was reinforced in 2002 in patent application US20030236689 A1 which applied predictive quantitative models to data and used rules to correlate context data at different stages of the business process with business process outcomes to be presented to end users.

LogRhythm Inc. advanced the concept in 2010 by adding event managers to the end of the intelligence engine's process to determine reporting, remediation and other outcomes.

== Traits ==
As a system that combines human intelligence, data inputs, automated decision-making and unified information access, intelligence engines are an advancement in business intelligence tools because they:

- integrate structured data and unstructured content in a single index
- provide advanced workflow automation that can trigger multiple business processes
- project future impact of data such as supply chain threats
- recommend best actions / highlight opportunities for process improvement
- leverage business intelligence from a variety of experts
- scale data visualization capabilities with the number of users

== Applications ==
- Attivio Active Intelligence Engine
- KPMG Spectrum Intelligence Engine(s)
- Salesforce Service Cloud Intelligence Engine
- FireEye Threat Intelligence Engine
- Factiva Intelligence Engine
- Parasoft Process Intelligence Engine

== See also ==
- Business intelligence (BI)
- Business intelligence tools
- Business rule management system
- Data mining
- Data science
- Decision management
- Enterprise information management
- Predictive analytics
- Prescriptive analytics
