= Decision analysis =

Discipline covering formal decision making

Decision analysis (DA) is the discipline comprising the philosophy, methodology, and professional practice necessary to address important decisions in a formal manner. Decision analysis includes many procedures, methods, and tools for identifying, clearly representing, and formally assessing important aspects of a decision; for prescribing a recommended course of action by applying the maximum expected-utility axiom to a well-formed representation of the decision; and for translating the formal representation of a decision and its corresponding recommendation into insight for the decision maker, and other corporate and non-corporate stakeholders.

== History ==
In 1931, mathematical philosopher Frank Ramsey pioneered the idea of subjective probability as a representation of an individual's beliefs or uncertainties. Then, in the 1940s, mathematician John von Neumann and economist Oskar Morgenstern developed an axiomatic basis for utility theory as a way of expressing an individual's preferences over uncertain outcomes. (This is in contrast to social-choice theory, which addresses the problem of deriving group preferences from individual preferences.) Statistician Leonard Jimmie Savage then developed an alternate axiomatic framework for decision analysis in the early 1950s. The resulting expected-utility theory provides a complete axiomatic basis for decision making under uncertainty.

Once these basic theoretical developments had been established, the methods of decision analysis were then further codified and popularized, becoming widely taught (e.g., in business schools and departments of industrial engineering). The term "Decision Analysis" was first coined by Ronald A. Howard of Stanford University in a 1966 paper titled Decision Analysis: Applied Decision Theory. A brief and highly accessible introductory text was published in 1968 by decision theorist Howard Raiffa of the Harvard Business School. Subsequently, in 1976, Ralph Keeney and Howard Raiffa extended the basics of utility theory to provide a comprehensive methodology for handling decisions involving trade-offs between multiple objectives. Engineering professor Ron Howard of Stanford University and decision analyst Jim Matheson then published, in 1977, a set of readings on decision analysis; this was expanded into a two-volume set in 1984. Subsequent textbooks and additional developments are documented below under Further reading.

Although decision analysis is inherently interdisciplinary (involving contributions from mathematicians, philosophers, economists, statisticians, and cognitive psychologists), it has historically been considered a branch of operations research. In 1980, the Decision Analysis Society was formed as a special interest group within Operations Research Society of America (ORSA), which later merged with The Institute of Management Sciences (TIMS) to become the Institute for Operations Research and the Management Sciences (INFORMS). Beginning in 2004, INFORMS has published a dedicated journal for these topics, Decision Analysis.

Following along with these academic developments, decision analysis has also evolved into a mature professional discipline. The method has been used to support business and public-policy decision-making since the late 1950s; applications from 1990–2001 were reviewed in the inaugural issue of Decision Analysis. Decision analysis has been especially widely adopted in the pharmaceutical industry and the oil and gas industry, since both industries regularly need to make large high-risk decisions (e.g., about investing in development of a new drug or making a major acquisition).

== Methodology ==
Framing is the front end of decision analysis, which focuses on developing an opportunity statement (what and why), boundary conditions, success measures, a decision hierarchy, strategy table, and action items. It is sometimes believed that the application of decision analysis always requires the use of quantitative methods. In reality, however, many decisions can be made using qualitative tools that are part of the decision-analysis toolbox, such as value-focused thinking, without the need for quantitative methods.

The framing process may lead to the development of an influence diagram or decision tree. These are commonly used graphical representations of decision-analysis problems. These graphical tools are used to represent the alternatives available to the decision maker, the uncertainties they involve, and how well the decision maker's objectives would be achieved by various final outcomes. They can also form the basis of a quantitative model when needed. For example, quantitative methods of conducting Bayesian inference and identifying optimal decisions using influence diagrams were developed in the 1980s, and are now incorporated in software.

In a quantitative decision-analysis model, uncertainties are represented through probabilities—specifically, subjective probabilities. The decision maker's attitude to risk is represented by utility functions, and the attitude to trade-offs between conflicting objectives can be expressed using multi-attribute value functions or multi-attribute utility functions (if there is risk involved). (In some cases, utility functions can be replaced by the probability of achieving an uncertain aspiration level or "target".) Based on the axioms of decision analysis, the best decision to choose is the one whose consequences have the maximum expected utility (or that maximizes the probability of achieving the uncertain aspiration level).

It is sometimes assumed that quantitative decision analysis can be applied only to factors that lend themselves easily to measurement (e.g., in natural units such as dollars). However, quantitative decision analysis and related methods, such as applied information economics, can also be applied even to seemingly intangible factors.

== Decision analysis as a prescriptive approach ==
Prescriptive decision-making research focuses on how to make "optimal" decisions (based on the axioms of rationality), while descriptive decision-making research aims to explain how people actually make decisions (regardless of whether their decisions are "good" or optimal). Unsurprisingly, therefore, there are numerous situations in which decisions made by individuals depart markedly from the decisions that would be recommended by decision analysis.

Some have criticized formal methods of decision analysis for allowing decision makers to avoid taking responsibility for their own decisions, and instead recommend reliance on intuition or "gut feelings". Moreover, for decisions that must be made under significant time pressure, it is not surprising that formal methods of decision analysis are of little use, with intuition and expertise becoming more important. However, when time permits, studies have demonstrated that quantitative algorithms for decision making can yield results that are superior to "unaided intuition". In addition, despite the known biases in the types of human judgments required for decision analysis, research has shown at least a modest benefit of training and feedback in reducing bias.

Critics cite the phenomenon of paralysis by analysis as one possible consequence of over-reliance on decision analysis in organizations (the expense of decision analysis is in itself a factor in the analysis). However, strategies are available to reduce such risk.

There is currently a great deal of interest in quantitative methods for decision making. However, many such methods depart from the axioms of decision analysis, and can therefore generate misleading recommendations under some circumstances, so are not truly prescriptive methods. Some of the most popular of such non-decision-analytic methods include fuzzy-set theory for the representation of uncertainties, and the analytic-hierarchy process for the representation of preferences or value judgments. While there may occasionally be justification for such methods in applications (e.g., based on ease of use), decision analysts would argue for multi-attribute utility theory as the gold standard to which other methods should be compared, based on its rigorous axiomatic basis.

Although decision analysis has been frequently used in support of government decision making, the basic theory applies only to individual decision makers. There is unfortunately no axiomatic prescriptive theory comparable to decision analysis that is specifically designed for group or public-policy decisions. For more on this topic, see group decision-making for discussions of the behavioral issues involved in group decisions, and social choice theory for theoretical considerations that can affect group decisions.

== Applications ==
Decision-analytic methods have been used in a wide variety of fields, including business (planning, marketing, negotiation), management, environmental remediation, health care, research, energy, exploration, litigation and dispute resolution, etc. An important early application was a study of the pros and cons of hurricane seeding, undertaken by the Stanford Research Institute in the early 1970s for the Environmental Science Services Administration (a predecessor of the National Oceanic and Atmospheric Administration).

Decision analysis is today used by major corporations to make multibillion-dollar capital investments. For example, In 2010, Chevron won the Decision Analysis Society Practice Award for its use of decision analysis in all major decisions. In a video detailing Chevron's use of decision analysis, Chevron Vice Chairman George Kirkland notes that "decision analysis is a part of how Chevron does business for a simple, but powerful, reason: it works." It can also be used to make complex personal decisions, such as planning for retirement, deciding when to have a child, planning a major vacation, or choosing among several possible medical treatments.

- Energy. Decision analysis has been used to structure the energy objectives for Germany.
- Entrepreneurship. The concept of certainty equivalents from decision analysis was used to design novel and highly efficient mechanisms for funding of new businesses that are desirable to both backers and entrepreneurs.
- Health Care. Decision analysis has been applied to medical decision making regarding breast cancer diagnosis and therapy, treatment of thyroid cancer, and lung cancer.
- Insurance. Decision analysts have explored the use of insurance as a mechanism to encourage adoption of beneficial health behaviors. The method has also been applied to determine optimal strategies for purchase of long-term care insurance as a function of age, wealth, and risk tolerance.
- Litigation. Attorneys use decision analysis or litigation risk analysis to identify likely outcomes, improve litigation strategy and communicate financial risk to their clients more clearly. Mediators use decision analysis to show parties the value of their case and adjust expectations.
- Portfolio Management. Decision analysis has been recommended as a method of improving resource allocations in portfolio management.
- Military Planning. Decision analysis has been applied to the problem of base closure.
- Radioactive Waste. Decision analysis has been used to evaluate alternatives for radioactive-waste repositories in both the United States and the United Kingdom. At a smaller scale, it has also been used to evaluate options for dealing with surplus weapons-grade plutonium.
- Research and Development. Decision analysis has been used to recommend portfolios of projects to fund in research and development.
- Terrorism and Homeland Security. Decision analysis has been used to represent the values of both terrorists and defenders to support homeland-security decision making.
- Projects. Decision-analytic methods are increasingly applied in project settings to quantify uncertainties in cost, schedule, risk, and benefit outcomes, thereby improving project prioritization, forecasting, and decision-making. Even seemingly intangible project variables can be measured and entered into decision models, making projects more amenable to rigorous decision-analysis techniques.

== Software ==
Decision-making software packages are available for implementing decision analysis. Some particularly notable packages include Analytica for influence diagrams, DecideIT and Logical Decisions for multi-attribute decision making, and Eperoto for decision analysis in litigation.

== See also ==
- Choice
- Decision analysis cycle
- Decision conferencing
- Decision engineering
- Decision making software
- Decision model
- Decision quality
- Decision support
- Decision theory
- Influence diagram
- Management science
- Micromort
- Multiple-criteria decision analysis (MCDA)
- Optimal decision
- Stochastic dominance
- Value tree analysis
