= David Spiegelhalter =

English statistician (born 1953)

Sir David Spiegelhalter OBE FRS
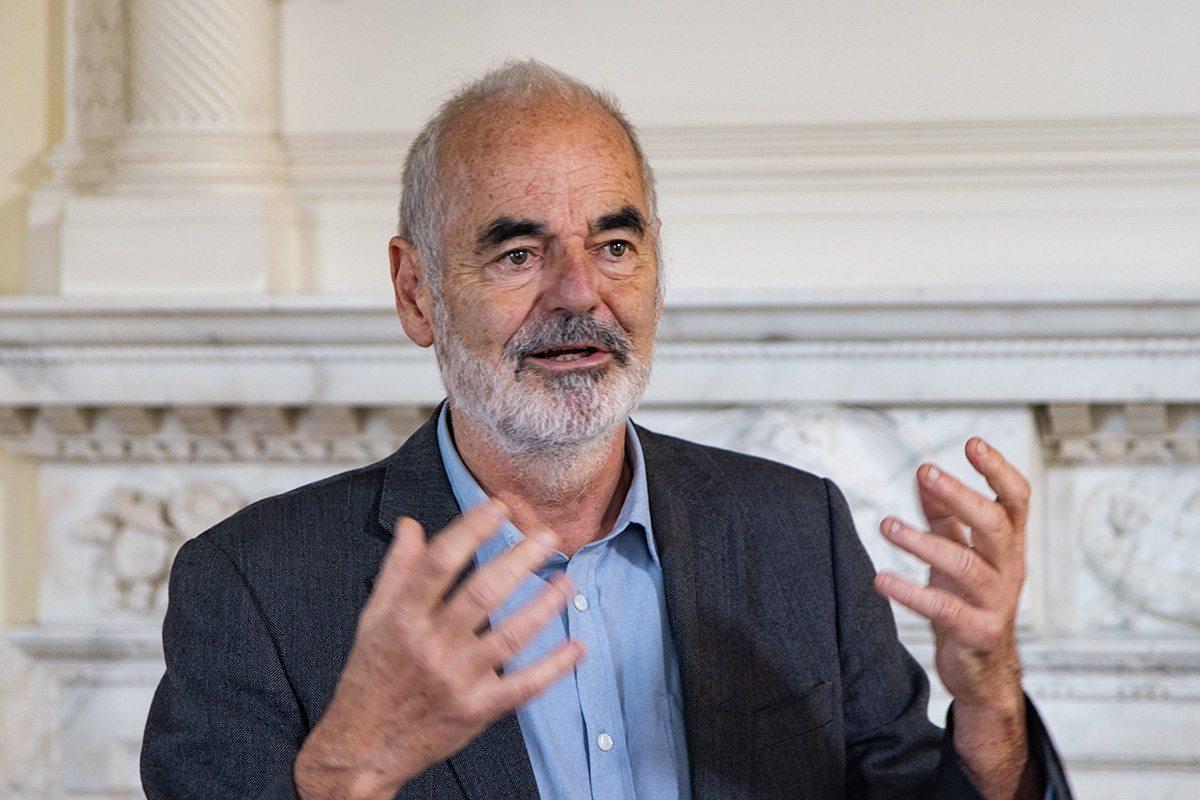
- Spiegelhalter giving a presentation in November 2020
- Born: David John Spiegelhalter; 16 August 1953 (age 73); Barnstaple, Devon, England
- Education: University of Oxford (BA); University College London (MSc, PhD)
- Awards: Guy Medal; OBE; FRS (2005); Weldon Memorial Prize (2009); Knight Bachelor (2014)
- Scientific career
- Fields: Statistics; Biostatistics
- Workplaces: University of Cambridge; University of California, Berkeley; Brunel University; University of Nottingham
- Thesis: Adaptive inference using finite mixture models (1978)
- Doctoral advisor: Adrian Smith
- Website: www.statslab.cam.ac.uk/person/ds28

Sir David John Spiegelhalter (born 16 August 1953) is a British statistician and a Fellow of Churchill College, Cambridge. From 2007 to 2018 he was Winton Professor of the Public Understanding of Risk in the Statistical Laboratory at the University of Cambridge. Spiegelhalter is an ISI highly cited researcher.

He is currently Chair of the Winton Centre for Risk and Evidence Communication in the Centre for Mathematical Sciences at Cambridge. On 27 May 2020 he joined the board of the UK Statistics Authority as a non-executive director for a period of three years, a term which was extended through to 2026.

== Early life and education ==
Spiegelhalter was born on 16 August 1953. He was educated at Barnstaple Grammar School, a state grammar school in Barnstaple, Devon, from 1963 to 1970. He then studied mathematics at Keble College, Oxford, graduating with a Bachelor of Arts (BA) degree in 1974. He moved to University College London, where he gained his Master of Science (MSc) degree in statistics in 1975 and a Doctor of Philosophy (PhD) degree in mathematical statistics in 1978. His doctoral thesis was titled "Adaptive Inference Using Finite Mixture Models", and was supervised by Adrian Smith.

== Career ==
Spiegelhalter was research assistant in Brunel University in 1976 and then visiting lecturer at the University of California, Berkeley, 1977–78. After his PhD, he was a research assistant for the Royal College of Physicians; he was based at the University of Nottingham, where his PhD supervisor, Adrian Smith, had been appointed a professor.

From 1981 he was at the Medical Research Council Biostatistics Unit at Cambridge. He has been an honorary lecturer at the University of Hong Kong since 1991. He has also been a consultant for GlaxoSmithKline, Novartis and the World Anti-Doping Agency. He played a leading role in the public inquiries into children's heart surgery at the Bristol Royal Infirmary, the murders by Harold Shipman, the independent inquiry on Mid Staffs Trust and, more recently, the infected blood inquiry.

Between 2007 and 2012 he divided his work between the Cambridge Statistical Laboratory (three-fifths) and the Medical Research Council Biostatistics Unit (two-fifths). He left the MRC in March 2012 and worked full-time at the Statistical Laboratory as the Winton Professor of the Public Understanding of Risk until his retirement. He remained chair of the Winton Centre until it closed in 2023. As of 2012 Spiegelhalter has supervised 7 PhD students.

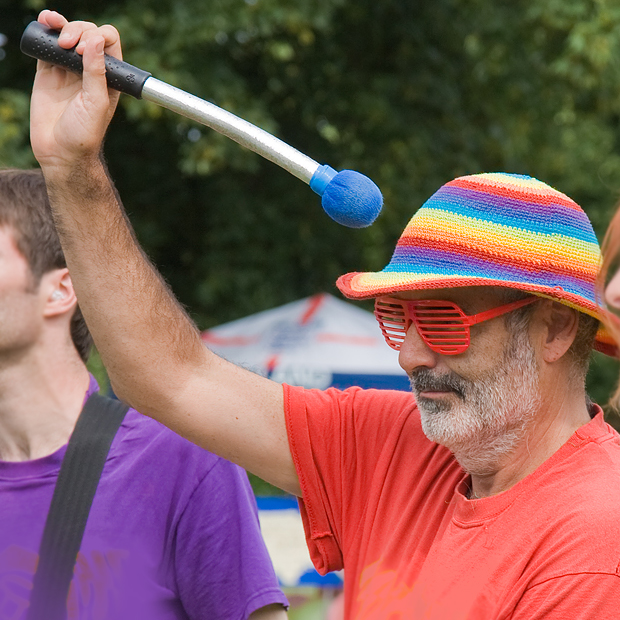
David Spiegelhalter playing with Arco Iris Samba band, July 2009

In 2012, Spiegelhalter hosted the BBC Four documentary Tails You Win: The Science of Chance which described the application of probability in everyday life. He also presented a 2013 Cambridge Science Festival talk, How to Spot a Shabby Statistic at the Babbage Lecture Theatre in Cambridge.

He was elected as President of the Royal Statistical Society, and took up the position on 1 January 2017. His Presidential address later that year took as its subject Trust in Numbers.

In March 2020 Spiegelhalter launched a podcast called Risky Talk where he interviews experts in risk and evidence communication on topics like genetics, nutrition, climate change and immigration. He appeared on BBC Desert Island Discs on 6 February 2022.

== Research ==
Spiegelhalter's research interests are in statistics including

- Bayesian approach to clinical trials, expert systems and complex modelling and epidemiology.
- Graphical models of conditional independence. He wrote several papers in the 1980s that showed how probability could be incorporated into expert systems, a problem that seemed intractable at the time. Spiegelhalter showed that while frequentist probability did not lend itself to expert systems, Bayesian probability most certainly did.
- Statistical software. In the 1990s Spiegelhalter led the Medical Research Council team that developed WinBUGS ("Bayesian analysis Using Gibbs Sampling"), a statistical-modelling system allowing hierarchical prior distributions. WinBUGS and its successor OpenBUGS specifies graphical models using acyclic directed graphs whose nodes are random variables, which are updated using Gibbs sampling (an updating method for Markov chain Monte Carlo (MCMC) simulation). Earlier Bayesian software had required that the probability distribution for the observed data be an exponential family and that the prior be its conjugate distribution. Allowing flexible choices of prior distributions simplified hierarchical modelling and helped to promote multilevel models, which became widely used in epidemiology and education.
- General issues in clinical trials, including cluster randomisation, meta-analysis and ethical monitoring.
- Monitoring and comparing clinical and public-health outcomes and their associated publication as performance indicators.
- Public understanding of risk, including promoting concepts such as the micromort (a one in a million chance of death) and microlife (a 30-minute reduction of life expectancy). Media reporting of statistics, risk and probability and the wider conception of uncertainty as going beyond what is measured to model uncertainty, the unknown and the unmeasurable.

In 2003 Spiegelhalter and others published a paper on the many murders of physician Harold Shipman, in which they found that routine statistical monitoring of mortality could have revealed the murders in 1996, two years and many murders before suspicions were actually raised.

== Honours ==
- 1975 Fellow, Royal Statistical Society
- 1985 Guy Medal in Bronze, Royal Statistical Society
- 1990 Award for Outstanding Statistical Application, American Statistical Association
- 1993 Chartered Statistician, Royal Statistical Society
- 1994 Guy Medal in Silver, Royal Statistical Society
- 1994 Honorary Doctorate, Aalborg University, Denmark
- 2005 Elected a Fellow of the Royal Society (FRS)
- 2006 Appointed Officer of the Order of the British Empire (OBE) in the Queen's Birthday Honours for services to medical research
- 2006 Appointed Honorary Professor of Biostatistics at University of Cambridge
- 2009 Weldon Memorial Prize and Medal
- 2010 Honorary Doctorate of Science, Plymouth University
- 2013 Honorary Doctorate of Science, University of Bath
- 2013 Honorary Doctorate from Heriot-Watt University
- 2014 Knighted in the 2014 Birthday Honours for services to statistics
- 2016 Honorary Fellow Institute and Faculty of Actuaries
- 2020 Guy Medal in Gold, Royal Statistical Society
- 2020 Michael Faraday Prize of the Royal Society
- 2021 Honorary Fellow of the Market Research Society
- 2023 Honorary Doctorate, Athens University of Economics and Business
- 2023 Honorary Doctorate of Laws, Dundee University
- 2025 Honorary Doctorate, KU Leuven
- 2026 Elected Fellow of the Academy for the Mathematical Sciences

== Media appearances ==
- Horizon – To Infinity and Beyond (10 February 2010)
- The Joy of Stats (7 December 2010)
- Horizon – What is One Degree? (10 January 2011) – Interviewed by Ben Miller
- Winter Wipeout – BBC One (17 December 2011)
- Tails You Win: The Science of Chance (18 October 2012)
- Horizon – Should I Eat Meat? The Big Health Dilemma (18 August 2014)
- Through the Wormhole with Morgan Freeman (2014)
- Climate Change by Numbers (2 March 2015)
- Panorama – Why Are Gambling Machines Addictive? (12 September 2016)
- The 80,000 Hours Podcast – (21 June – 2017)
- Social Science Bites – (2 April 2018)
- The Infinite Monkey Cage: 100th Episode TV Special – (13 July 2018)
- Risky Talk; host of Risky Talk the podcast (5 February 2020 – ongoing)
- Scientists in the Spotlight with Jim Al-Khalili. BBC Sounds (15 December 2020)
- Desert Island Discs, BBC Radio 4 (11 February 2022)

== Bibliography ==
- Sex by Numbers: What Statistics Can Tell Us About Sexual Behaviour (2015, Wellcome Collection) ISBN 978-1-78125-329-8
- Teaching Probability (2016, Cambridge University Press) (with Jenny Gage) ISBN 978-1-316-60589-9
- The Art of Statistics: Learning from Data (2019, Pelican) ISBN 978-0-241-39863-0
- Covid by Numbers: Making Sense of the Pandemic with Data (2021, Pelican) (with Dr Anthony Masters) ISBN 978-0-241-54773-1
- The Art of Uncertainty: Living with Chance, Ignorance, Risk and Luck (2024, Pelican) ISBN 978-0-241-65862-8
