= DecideIT =

DecideIT is a decision-making software for the Microsoft Windows operating system. It is based on multi-criteria decision making (MCDM) and the multi-attribute value theory (MAVT). It supports both value tree analysis for multi-attribute decision problems as well as decision tree analysis for evaluating decisions under risk and can combine these structures in a common model.

The software implements the Delta MCDM method and is therefore able to handle imprecise statements in terms of intervals, rankings, and comparisons. Earlier versions employed a so-called contraction analysis approach to evaluate decision problems with imprecise information, but as from DecideIT 3, the software supports second-order probabilities which enables a more discriminative power and more informative means for decision evaluation when expected value intervals are overlapping.

The software has been used for addressing decision problems in various domains, such as evaluation of fuels and biomass systems, district heating, energy transition, community decision-making., outbreak response measures, selection of tool for digital forensics, and broadband technology selection.

DecideIT is developed and maintained by the Swedish company Preference.
