= Microlife =

Unit of risk – half an hour of life expectancy

A microlife is a unit of risk representing half an hour change of life expectancy. It is calculated as being roughly a millionth of a 57-year lifetime of adult exposure to the world.

Discussed by David Spiegelhalter and Alejandro Leiva, and also used by Lin et al. for decision analysis, microlives are intended as a simple way of communicating the impact of a lifestyle or environmental risk factor, based on the associated daily proportional effect on expected length of life. Similar to the micromort (one in a million probability of death) the microlife is intended for "rough but fair comparisons between the sizes of chronic risks". This is to avoid the biasing effects of describing risks in relative hazard ratios, converting them into somewhat tangible units. Similarly they bring long-term future risks into the here-and-now as a gain or loss of time.

The microlife exploits the fact that for small hazard ratios the change in life expectancy is roughly linear. They are by necessity rough estimates, based on averages over population and lifetime. Effects of individual variability, short-term or changing habits, and causal factors are not taken into account.

== Examples ==
Spiegelhalter gives the following examples of microlife impacts, based on estimated life expectancy effects of long term lifestyle and demographic risk factors, for men and women aged 35 years:

Microlives gained/lost per day of exposure
Risk factor	Men	Women
Smoking
Smoking 15–24 cigarettes	−10	−9
Alcohol intake*
First drink (of 10 g alcohol)	1	1
Each subsequent drink (up to 6)	−½	−1
Obesity
Per 5 units above body mass index of 22.5 each day	−3	−3
Per 5 kg above optimum weight for average height each day	−1	−1
Sedentary behaviour
2 hours watching television	−1	−1
Diet
Red meat, 1 portion (85 g, 3 oz)	−1	−1
Fruit and vegetable intake, =5 servings (blood vitamin C >50 nmol/L)	4	3
Coffee intake
2-3 cups	1	1
Physical activity
First 20 minutes of moderate exercise	2	2
Subsequent 40 minutes of moderate exercise	1	½
Statins
Taking a statin	1	1
Air pollution
Per day living in Mexico City v London	−½	−½
Geography
Per day being a resident of Russia v Sweden	−21	−9
Era
Per day living in 2010 v 1910	15	15
Per day living in 2010 v 1980	8	5

* Other sources say that drinking any amount of alcohol carries a health risk.

== See also ==
- Micromort
- Risk communication
