= Litigation risk analysis =

Litigation risk analysis is the application of decision analysis to litigation in order to assess the possible outcomes of a dispute and their likelihood. Besides producing a quantitative analysis of litigation risks it also identifies the key uncertainties and points of law that should be assessed in the case, helping parties to focus efforts in the most important areas.

== Background ==
Litigation risk analysis is a growing practice by lawyers, mediators, and other alternative dispute resolution (ADR) professionals. When applied in mediation settings, litigation risk analysis is used to determine litigated best alternative to negotiated agreement (BATNA) and worst alternative to negotiated agreement (WATNA) scenarios based upon the probabilities and possible outcomes of continuing to litigate the case rather than settle. The process of performing a litigation risk analysis by mediators has been hampered by the need for mediators to physically draw out the decision tree and perform calculations to arrive at an expected value (EV). However, there have been calls for more mediators to adopt the practice of performing such an analysis.

== Process ==
There are several models of litigation risk analysis. Many prosecutors, for instance, are increasingly turning to computer-assisted approaches such as decision-support systems, which are employed when conducting cost/benefits analysis and the evaluation of cost, risks of trial outcomes, legal fee arrangements, and so on. All these, however, share the goal of breaking down the complex legal proceeding into its basic parts and quantifying the risks and uncertainties entailed. A prosecutor can use this type of analysis when evaluating the type or the size of the case. It is employed for more complex outcomes such as case assessment, strategy decisions, and settlement analysis.
