= Ronald A. Howard =

American engineer (1934–2024)

- Born: August 27, 1934; Brooklyn, New York, US
- Died: October 6, 2024 (aged 90); Palo Alto, California, US

Academic background
- Education: MIT
- Thesis: Studies in Discrete Dynamic Programming (1958)
- Doctoral advisor: Philip M. Morse

Academic work
- Doctoral students: Elisabeth Pate-Cornell

Ronald Arthur Howard (August 27, 1934 – October 6, 2024) was a professor in the Department of Engineering-Economic Systems (now the Department of Management Science and Engineering) in the School of Engineering at Stanford University.

== Education and career ==
Howard was born in Brooklyn, New York. He earned his Sc.D. in Electrical Engineering from MIT in 1958 (under George E. Kimball) and was an associate professor there until he joined Stanford in 1965. He pioneered the policy iteration method for solving Markov decision problems, and this method is sometimes called the "Howard policy-improvement algorithm" in his honor. He was also instrumental in the development of the Influence diagram for the graphical analysis of decision situations.

Howard directed teaching and research in decision analysis at Stanford and was the director of the Decisions and Ethics Center, which examines the efficacy and ethics of decision making under uncertainties. He coined the term "Decision Analysis" in a paper in 1966, kickstarting the field. He was a founding director and chairman of Strategic Decisions Group. Interests included improving the quality of decisions, life-and-death decision-making, and the creation of a coercion-free society. Howard also taught a graduate-level course, "Voluntary Social Systems," which investigated the means of constructing and operating a coercion-free society.

In 1980 Howard introduced the concept of micromort as a one-in-a-million chance of death.

== Honors and awards ==
In 1986 he received the Operations Research Society of America's Frank P. Ramsey Medal "for distinguished contributions in decision analysis". In 1998 he received from the Institute for Operations Research and the Management Sciences (INFORMS) the first award for the teaching of operations research/management science practice. In 1999 INFORMS invited him to give the Omega Rho Distinguished Plenary Lecture at the Cincinnati National Meeting.

Howard was elected a member of the National Academy of Engineering in 1999 for contributions to the foundations of decision analysis and its application. He received the Dean's Award for Academic Excellence. He was elected to the 2002 class of Fellows of the Institute for Operations Research and the Management Sciences. The Raiffa-Howard award for organizational decision quality is named after him and Howard Raiffa.

== Publications ==
- 1960. Dynamic Programming and Markov Processes, The M.I.T. Press. OCLC 523881
- 1966. Decision Analysis: Applied Decision Theory, Proceedings of the Fourth International Conference on Operations Research, Boston.
- 1971. Dynamic Probabilistic Systems (two volumes), John Wiley & Sons, Inc., New York City.
- 1977. Readings in Decision Analysis. With Jim E. Matheson (editors). SRI International, Menlo Park, California.
- 1984. Readings on the Principles and Applications of Decision Analysis. (volume 1, volume 2). With Jim E. Matheson (editors). Menlo Park CA: Strategic Decisions Group.
- 2008. Ethics for the Real World. With Clinton D. Korver. Harvard Business Press. ISBN 978-1-4221-2106-1
- 2015. "Foundations of Decision Analysis". With Ali Abbas. Pearson.
