= Robert Schlaifer =

American mathematician (1914–1994)

Robert Osher Schlaifer (13 September 1914 – 24 July 1994) was an American statistician who was a pioneer of Bayesian decision theory. At the time of his death he was William Ziegler Professor of Business Administration Emeritus of the Harvard Business School. In 1961 he was elected as a Fellow of the American Statistical Association.

== Biography ==
The son of Osher Schlaifer (who was later the superintendent of schools in Dundee, Illinois), a native of Vermillion, S.D., and a graduate of Amherst College, Schlaifer had a unique background for a statistical decision theorist. He was trained as a classical historian and classical Greek scholar: he attended the American School of Classical Studies at Athens and earned a Ph.D. in ancient history at Harvard in 1940. He taught history, economics and physics at the Faculty of Arts and Sciences at Harvard. During the Second World War he started writing technical reports and produced a major volume on the development of aircraft engines. He got an appointment at the Harvard Business School and when the statistics teacher retired he started to teach statistics—starting by teaching himself. He had very little mathematical background and Raiffa recalled how they worked together: "I would teach him something about linear algebra in the morning and he would show me how it could be applied in the afternoon." (from the interview with Fienberg)

Schlaifer made an important contribution to Bayesian decision theory. His work and his character are described in the following appreciations.

In 1992 the Decision Analysis Society awarded Schlaifer the Frank P. Ramsey Medal for distinguished contributions to the field of decision analysis. In making the award Bob Winkler noted Schlaifer's pioneering efforts in decision analysis.

His 1959 book, Probability and Statistics for Business Decisions, was a landmark effort, coming only five years after L. J. Savage, in his classic Foundations of Statistics, presented a development of subjective probability and utility but then inexplicably reverted to minimax arguments in the latter part of the book. Schlaifer, with no formal training in statistics or mathematical modeling, got it right and took the first steps toward bridging the theory/practice gap.

Winkler also quoted the following assessment from Howard Raiffa, who worked with Schlaifer and was the recipient of the first Ramsey Medal in 1984:

"The basic ideas of statistical decision theory were conceived by (Schlaifer) independently of the work of L. J. Savage or de Finetti, and early on he saw that those ideas were broadly applicable to problems in decision making under uncertainty. He was a pioneer in the practical assessment of subjective probabilities and utilities… (Schlaifer) influenced my intellectual development more than any other individual — more than Abraham Wald or von Neumann or Savage or Arrow."

In the preface to the second 1971 edition of Foundations of Statistics Savage wrote:

This is a welcome opportunity to say that his [Schlaifer's] ideas were developed wholly independently of the present book, and indeed of other personalistic literature. They are in full harmony with the ideas of this book but are more down to earth and less spellbound by tradition.

Schlaifer's book with John W. Pratt and Raiffa was published posthumously and his co-authors wrote this dedication:

Robert O. Schlaifer (1915–1994): An original, deep, creative, indefatigable, persistent, versatile, demanding, sometimes irascible scholar, who was an inspiration to us both.

== Role in development of aircraft engines & fuels ==
Schlaifer was involved in the development of military aircraft engines and fuels prior to World War II. He found that the best way to get a good engine quickly was to bring to test as soon as possible a number of alternate designs, pick one that combined good characteristics with few development problems, and then work intensely to develop it.

== Some publications of Robert Schlaifer ==
- Greek Theories of Slavery from Homer to Aristotle, Harvard Studies in Classical Philology, Vol. 47 (1936), pp. 165–204.
- Demon of Paeania, Priest of Asclepius, Classical Philology, Vol. 38, No. 1 (Jan., 1943), pp. 39–43.
- Development of Aircraft Engines. Boston : Division of Research, Graduate School of Business Administration, Harvard University, 1950.
- Probability and statistics for business decisions. An introduction to managerial economics under uncertainty New York: McGraw-Hill Book Co., 1959
- Applied statistical decision theory (with Howard Raiffa) Cambridge, Mass.: MIT Press, 1961.
- Introduction to statistical decision theory John W. Pratt, Howard Raiffa, Robert Schlaifer preliminary edition, 1965. Cambridge, Mass.: MIT Press, 1995.
- Analysis of decisions under uncertainty. New York: McGraw-Hill Book Co., 1969.
