= Micromort =

Unit of risk – one-in-a-million chance of death

A micromort (from micro- and mortality) is a unit of risk defined as a one-in-a-million chance of death. Micromorts are usually assigned per event, or per unit of time a person is exposed to something. Micromorts can be used to measure the riskiness of various day-to-day activities. A microprobability is a one-in-a million chance of some event; thus, a micromort is the microprobability of mortality from an event, or the health impacts of an event. The micromort concept was introduced by Ronald A. Howard who pioneered the modern practice of decision analysis.

Micromorts for future activities can only be rough assessments, as specific circumstances will always have an impact. However, past historical rates of events can be used to provide a rough estimate.

A related and somewhat opposing unit is the microlife, which measures statistical improvements to life expectancy from an activity—one example being regular aerobic exercise.

== Baseline ==
Death from	Context	Time period	N deaths	N population	Micromorts per unit of exposure	Reference
All causes	England and Wales	2012	499,331	56,567,000	24 per day 8,800 per year	ONS Deaths Table 5.
All causes	Canada	2011	242,074	33,476,688	20 per day 7,200 per year	Statistics Canada
All causes	US	2010	2,468,435	308,500,000	22 per day 8,000 per year	CDC Deaths Table 18.
Non-natural cause	England and Wales	2012	17,462	56,567,000	0.8 per day 300 per year	ONS Deaths Table 5.19.
Non-natural cause	US	2010	180,000	308,500,000	1.6 per day 580 per year	CDC Deaths Table 18
Non-natural cause (excluding suicide)	England and Wales	2012	12,955	56,567,000	0.6 per day 230 per year	ONS Suicides
Non-natural cause (excluding suicide)	US	2010	142,000	308,500,000	1.3 per day 460 per year	CDC Deaths Table 18.
All causes – first day of life	England and Wales	2007			430 per first day of life	Walker, 2014
All causes – first day of life	US	2013			16.7 per day 6100 per year	CDC Life Tables; Blastland & Spiegelhalter, 2014
Murder/homicide	England and Wales	2012/13	551	56,567,000	10 per year	ONS Crime
Homicide	Canada	2011	527	33,476,688	15 per year	Statistics Canada
Murder and non-negligent manslaughter	US	2012	14,173	292,000,000	48 per year	FBI Table 16

== Leisure and sport ==
Death from	Context	Time period	N deaths	N exposure	Micromorts per unit of exposure	Reference
Scuba diving	UK: BSAC members	1998–2009	75	14,000,000 dives	5 per dive	BSAC
Scuba diving	UK: non-BSAC	1998–2009	122	12,000,000 dives	10 per dive	BSAC
Scuba diving	US – insured members of DAN	2000–2006	187	1,131,367 members	164 per year as member of DAN; 5 per dive	DAN p75
Paragliding	Turkey	2004–2011	18	242,355 flights	74 per launch	Canbek 2015
Skiing	US	2008/9	39	57,000,000 days skiing	0.7 per day	Ski-injury.com
Skydiving	US	2000–2016	413	48,600,000 jumps	8 per jump	USPA
Skydiving	UK	1994–2013	41	4,864,268 jumps	8 per jump	BPA
BASE jumping	Kjerag Massif, Norway	1995–2005	9	20,850 jumps	430 per jump	Soreide 2007
Mountaineering	Ascent to Matterhorn	1981–2011	213	about 75,000 ascents (about 2500 per year)	about 2,840 per ascent attempt	Bachmann 2012
Mountaineering	Ascent to Mt. Everest	1922–2012	223	5,656 successful ascents	37,932 per successful ascent	NASA 2013

== Travel ==
The distance associated with a gain of one micromort, by mode of transportation:

- Travelling 8.8 miles (14 km) by motorcycle (collision, UK)
- Travelling 30 miles (50 km) by walking (collision, UK)
- Travelling 44 miles (71 km) by bicycle (collision, UK) (Note: however due to the health effects of cycling the net effect of cycling on life expectancy is likely positive in most cases)
- Travelling 370 miles (600 km) by car (collision, UK)
- Travelling 1,000 miles (1,600 km) by jet airplane (collision)
- Travelling 6,000 miles (10,000 km) by train (collision)

== Other ==
Increase in death risk for other activities on a per-event basis:

- Hang gliding – 8 micromorts per flight
- Ecstasy (MDMA) – 0.5 micromorts per tablet, rising to 13 if using other drugs
- Giving birth (vaginal) – 120 micromorts
- Giving birth (caesarean) – 170 micromorts
- AstraZeneca vaccination against COVID-19 – 2.9 micromorts
- COVID-19 infection at age 10, in December 2020 – 20 micromorts
- COVID-19 infection at age 25, in December 2020 – 100 micromorts
- COVID-19 infection at age 55, in December 2020 – 4,000 micromorts
- COVID-19 infection at age 65, in December 2020 – 14,000 micromorts
- COVID-19 infection at age 75, in December 2020 – 46,000 micromorts
- COVID-19 infection at age 85, in December 2020 – 150,000 micromorts

== Value of a micromort ==
=== Willingness to pay ===
An application of micromorts is measuring the value that humans place on risk. For example, a person can consider the amount of money they would be willing to pay to avoid a one-in-a-million chance of death (or conversely, the amount of money they would receive to accept a one-in-a-million chance of death). When offered this situation, people claim a high number. However, when looking at their day-to-day actions (e.g., how much they are willing to pay for safety features on cars), a typical value for a micromort is around $50 (in 2009). This is not to say the $50 valuation should be taken to mean that a human life (1 million micromorts) is valued at $50,000,000. Rather, people are less inclined to spend money after a certain point to increase their safety. This means that analyzing risk using the micromort is more useful when using small risks, not necessarily large ones.

=== Value of a statistical life ===
Government agencies use a nominal Value of a Statistical Life (VSL) – or Value for Preventing a Fatality (VPF) – to evaluate the cost-effectiveness of expenditure on safeguards. For example, in the UK, the VSL is £1 million GBP in 1997 value (equivalent to £2 million in 2025). Since road improvements have the effect of lowering the risk of large numbers of people by a small amount, the UK Department for Transport essentially prices a reduction of 1 micromort at £1.60. The US Department of Transportation uses a VSL of US$6.2 million, pricing a micromort at US$6.20.

== Chronic risks ==
Micromorts are best used to measure the size of acute risks, i.e. immediate deaths. Risks from lifestyle, exposure to air pollution, and so on are chronic risks, in that they do not kill straight away, but reduce life expectancy. Ron Howard included such risks in his original 1979 work, for example, an additional one micromort from:

- Drinking 0.5 liter of wine (cirrhosis of the liver)
- Smoking 1.4 cigarettes (cancer, heart disease)
- Spending 1 hour in a coal mine (black lung disease)
- Spending 3 hours in a coal mine (accident)
- Living 2 days in New York or Boston in 1979 (air pollution)
- Living 2 months with a smoker (cancer, heart disease)
- Drinking Miami water for 1 year (cancer from chloroform)
- Eating 100 charcoal-broiled steaks (cancer from benzopyrene)
- Traveling 6000 miles (10,000 km) by jet (cancer due to increased background radiation)

Chronic risks are typically measured in terms of individual life expectancy, rather than death rates. Therefore, chronic risks are better measured with a related unit, the microlife.

== See also ==
- Decision analysis – Discipline covering formal decision making
- Decision theory – Branch of applied probability theory
- Ellsberg paradox – Paradox in decision theory
- List of unusual units of measurement – Units that are not part of a coherent system
- Microlife – Unit of risk – half an hour of life expectancy
- Precautionary principle – Risk management strategy
- Risk of ruin – Concept in gambling, insurance, and finance
