= Action axiom =

Axiom of the form, "If a condition holds, then the following will be done"

An action axiom is an axiom that embodies a criterion for describing action. Action axioms are of the form "If a condition holds, then the following will be done".

== On the action axiom ==
Decision theory and, hence, decision analysis are based on the maximum expected utility (MEU) action axiom. In general, the principle for action embodied by an action axiom (such as MEU) is highly defensible and its scope very broad.

The action-axiom is the basis of praxeology in the Austrian School, and it is the proposition that all specimens of the species Homo sapiens, the Homo agens, purposely utilize means over a period of time in order to achieve desired ends. In Human Action, Ludwig von Mises defined “action” in the sense of the action axiom by elucidating:

Human action is purposeful behavior. Or we may say: Action is will put into operation and transformed into an agency, is aiming at ends and goals, is the ego's meaningful response to stimuli and to the conditions of its environment, is a person's conscious adjustment to the state of the universe that determines his life. Such paraphrases may clarify the definition given and prevent possible misinterpretations. But the definition itself is adequate and does not need complement of commentary.

== See also ==
- Norm (artificial intelligence)
