= Decision intelligence =

Subfield of machine learning

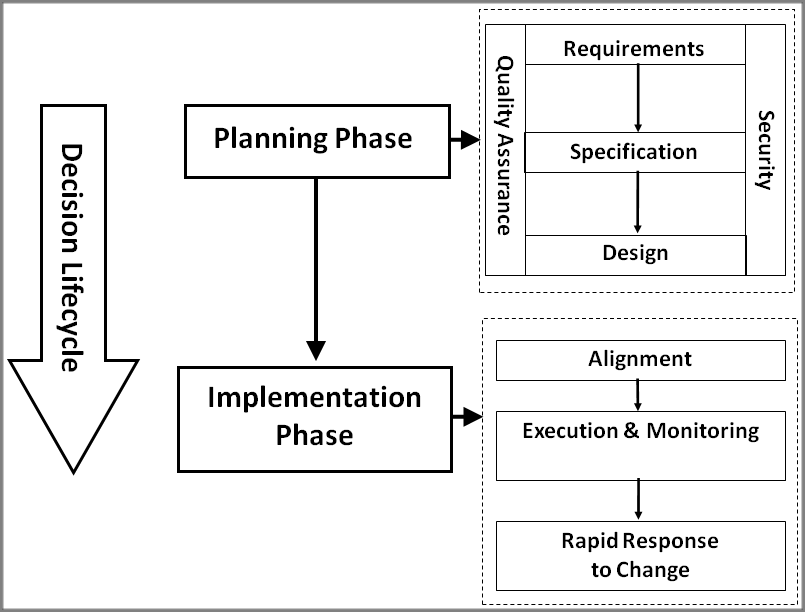
Decision intelligence framework

Decision intelligence is an engineering discipline that augments data science with theory from social science, decision theory, and managerial science. Its application provides a framework for best practices in organizational decision-making and processes for applying computational technologies such as machine learning, natural language processing, reasoning, and semantics at scale. The basic idea is that decisions are based on our understanding of how actions lead to outcomes. Decision intelligence is a discipline for analyzing this chain of cause and effect, and decision modeling is a visual language for representing these chains.

A related field, decision engineering, also investigates the improvement of decision-making processes but is not always as closely tied to data science.^{[Note]}

== Origins and technologies ==
Decision intelligence is based on the recognition that, in many organizations, decision-making could be improved if a more structured approach were used. Decision intelligence seeks to overcome a decision-making "complexity ceiling", which is characterized by a mismatch between the sophistication of organizational decision-making practices and the complexity of situations in which those decisions must be made. As such, it seeks to solve some of the issues identified around complexity theory and organizations.

In this sense, decision intelligence represents a practical application of the field of complex systems, which helps organizations to navigate the complex systems in which they find themselves. AI need not replace decision intelligence, rather its role may instead be an intelligence layer within adaptive opportunity governance: exploring possibilities, preserving knowledge, monitoring uncertainty, synthesizing evidence, and identifying where additional information could most improve a decision. Decision intelligence can also be thought of as a framework that brings advanced analytics and machine learning techniques to the desktop of the non-expert decision maker, as well as incorporating, and then extending, data science to overcome the problems articulated in black swan theory.

Decision intelligence proponents believe that many organizations continue to make poor decisions. In response, decision intelligence seeks to unify a number of decision-making best practices, described in more detail below.

Decision intelligence builds on the insight that it is possible to design the decision itself, using principles previously used for designing more tangible objects like bridges and buildings.

The use of a visual design language representing decisions (see § Visual decision design) is an important element of decision intelligence, since it provides an intuitive common language readily understood by all decision participants. A visual metaphor improves the ability to reason about complex systems as well as to enhance collaboration.

In addition to visual decision design, there are other two aspects of engineering disciplines that aid mass adoption. These are:

1. the creation of a shared language of design elements and
2. the use of a common methodology or process, as illustrated in the diagram above.

== Motivation ==
The need for a unified methodology of decision-making is driven by a number of factors that organizations face as they make difficult decisions in a complex internal and external environment.

Recognition of the broad-based inability of current methods to solve decision-making issues in practice comes from several sources, including government sources and industries such as telecommunications, media, the automotive industry, and pharmaceuticals.

Examples:

- The outcomes of decisions are becoming more complex, going well beyond next quarter's revenues or other tangible outcomes to multiple goals that must be satisfied together, some of which are often intangible:

The car is becoming an expression of identity, values, and personal control in ways that move far beyond traditional segmentation and branding. For example, fuel efficiency will be only one consideration for a socially responsible vehicle (SRV). What percent of the parts are recyclable? What is the vehicle's total carbon footprint? Are there child labor inputs? Toxic paints, glues, or plastics? How transparent is the supply chain? Is the seller accountable for recycling? What methods are used? Are fair labor practices employed?

— Shoshana Zuboff, "The GM Solution: Life Boats, Not Life Support", Business Week, November 18, 2008

- Global increase in complexity:

We live in a dynamic world in which the pace, scope, and complexity of change are increasing. The continued march of globalization, the growing number of independent actors, and advancing technology have increased global connectivity, interdependence and complexity, creating greater uncertainties, systemic risk and a less predictable future. These changes have led to reduced warning times and compressed decision cycles.

— Director of National Intelligence, Vision 2015: A Globally Networked and Integrated Intelligence Enterprise, July 2008

== Transferring engineering principles ==
Unlike other decision making tools and methodologies, decision intelligence seeks to bring to bear a number of engineering practices to the process of creating a decision. These include requirements analysis, specification, scenario planning, quality assurance, security, and the use of design principles as described above. During the decision execution phase, outputs produced during the design phase can be used in a number of ways; monitoring approaches like business dashboards and assumption based planning are used to track the outcome of a decision and to trigger replanning as appropriate (one view of how some of these elements combine is shown in the diagram at the start of this article).

Decision intelligence has the potential to improve the quality of decisions made, the ability to make them more quickly, the ability to align organizational resources more effectively around a change in decisions, and lowers the risks associated with decisions. Furthermore, a designed decision can be reused and modified as new information is obtained.

== Bringing numerical methods to the desktop ==
Although many elements of decision intelligence, such as sensitivity analysis and analytics, are mature disciplines, they are not in wide use by decision makers. Decision intelligence seeks to create a visual language that serves to facilitate communication between them and quantitative experts, allowing broader utilization of these and other numerical and technical approaches.

In particular, dependency links in a decision model represent cause-and-effect (as in a causal loop diagram), data flow (as in a data flow diagram), or other relationships. As an example, one link might represent the connection between "mean time to repair a problem with telephone service" and "customer satisfaction", where a short repair time would presumably raise customer satisfaction. The functional form of these dependencies can be determined by a number of approaches. Numerical approaches, which analyze data to determine these functions, include machine learning and analytics algorithms (including artificial neural networks), as well as more traditional regression analysis. Results from operations research and many other quantitative approaches have a similar role to play.

When data is not available (or is too noisy, uncertain, or incomplete), these dependency links can take on the form of rules as might be found in an expert system or rule-based system, and so can be obtained through knowledge engineering.

In this way, a decision model represents a mechanism for combining multiple relationships, as well as symbolic and subsymbolic reasoning, into a complete solution to determining the outcome of a practical decision.

== Relationship to artificial intelligence and machine learning ==
As described above, decision model dependency links can be modeled using machine learning. In this respect, decision intelligence can be seen as a "multi-link" extension to artificial intelligence, which is most widely used for single-link analysis. From this point of view, machine learning can be viewed as answering the question "If I know/see/hear X, what can I conclude?", whereas decision intelligence answers: "If I take action X, what will be the outcome?". The latter question usually involves chains of events, sometimes including complex dynamics like feedback loops. In this way, decision intelligence unifies complex systems, machine learning, and decision analysis.

== Origins ==
Despite decades of development of decision support system and methodologies (like decision analysis), these are still less popular than spreadsheets as primary tools for decision-making. Decision intelligence seeks to bridge this gap, creating a critical mass of users of a common methodology and language for the core entities included in a decision, such as assumptions, external values, facts, data, and conclusions. If a pattern from previous industries holds, such a methodology will also facilitate technology adoption, by clarifying common maturity models and road maps that can be shared from one organization to another.

The decision intelligence approach is multidisciplinary, unifying findings on cognitive bias and decision-making, situational awareness, critical and creative thinking, collaboration and organizational design, with engineering technologies.

Decision intelligence is considered an improvement upon current organizational decision-making practices, which include the use of spreadsheets, text (sequential in nature, so is not a good fit for how information flows through a decision structure), and verbal argument. The movement from these largely informal structures to one in which a decision is documented in a well understood, visual language, echoes the creation of common blueprint methodologies in construction, with promise of similar benefits.

The discipline of decision intelligence combines old and new components. Many of its elements—such as the language of assessing assumptions, using logic to support an argument, the necessity of critical thinking to evaluate a decision, and understanding the impacts of bias—are ancient. Yet the realization that these elements can form a coherent whole that provides significant benefits to organizations by focusing on a common methodology is relatively new.

In 2018, Google's processes and training programs in applied data science were renamed to "decision intelligence" to indicate the central role of actions and decisions in the application of data science. The extent to which the theoretical frameworks drew on the managerial and social sciences in addition to data science was an additional motivator for unifying decision intelligence into a field of study that is distinct from data science.

Modern decision intelligence is highly interdisciplinary and academically inclusive. Research centering on decisions, defined broadly as biological and nonbiological action selection, is considered part of the discipline. Decision intelligence is not an umbrella term for data science and social science, however, since it does not cover components unconcerned with decisions.

== Visual decision design ==
Because it makes visible the otherwise invisible reasoning structures used in complex decisions, the design aspect of decision intelligence draws from other conceptual representation technologies like mind mapping, conceptual graphs, and semantic networks.

The basic idea is that a visual metaphor enhances intuitive thinking, inductive reasoning, and pattern recognition—important cognitive skills usually less accessible in a verbal or text discussion. A business decision map can be seen as one approach to a formal decision language to support decision intelligence.

=== Explicit representation of intangibles ===
Decision intelligence recognizes that many aspects of decision-making are based on intangible elements, including opportunity costs, employee morale, intellectual capital, brand recognition and other forms of business value that are not captured in traditional quantitative or financial models. Value network analysis—most notably value network maps—are therefore relevant here.

== See also ==
- Antifragility
- Business intelligence
- Decision quality
- Design rationale
- Heuristics in judgment and decision-making
- Management science

== Notes ==
Note the following semantic variations:

- Enterprise decision management (EDM) is a closely related discipline that focuses on automating decisions across an enterprise. Decision intelligence is from this point of view a superset of EDM, since it encompasses both manual and automated decision-making processes, unifying them into a common methodology that, when effective, breaks down barriers between quantitative analysis / analytics tools and departments and those with a more qualitative / strategic / management focus.
- The related term "decision engineering" is used in several industries. Each of these has a meaning that is distinct from what is discussed in the present article.
- Many years subsequent to the widespread use of the term, Mastercard trademarked the name "Decision Intelligence" for its AI/machine learning product.
- In behavioral economics, the related term "decision engineering" can mean the deliberate manipulation of consumer choices. In this use of the term, decision intelligence is roughly analogous to soft paternalism—a quite different meaning than is covered in the present article, referring as it does to the engineering of decisions made by consumers, rather than the use of engineering principles to aid in complex decision-making. Although distinctly different, this practice draws on much of the same decision-making research as does decision intelligence (such as, for the example, the work of behavioral economist Richard Thaler).
- Cost engineering measures the costs of engineering projects. Cost engineering is sometimes grouped into product engineering and design optimization as decision engineering. This can be distinguished from the broader framework of this article, which goes beyond the arena of engineering decisions to all decisions faced by organizations.
- Operations research is a closely related discipline and branch of applied mathematics that deals with the development and application of analytical methods to improve management and decision-making. Employing qualitative analytical methods such as Problem structuring methods or quantitative analytical methods such as Simulation, Statistics, and Mathematical optimization, operations research is often concerned with solving practical problems and determining the extreme values of some real-world decision objective: the maximum (of profit, performance, or yield) or minimum (of loss, risk, or cost). Because of its emphasis on practical applications, operations research has overlapped with many other disciplines, notably industrial engineering.

== Bibliography ==
- Peter F. Drucker. Harvard Business Review on Decision Making. (2001) ISBN 1-57851-557-2
- John S. Hammond. Smart Choices: A Practical Guide to Making Better Decisions. (2002) ISBN 0-7679-0886-4
- Edward Russo. Decision Traps. (1990) ISBN 0-385-24835-0
- Paul J.H. Shoemaker. Winning Decisions: Getting It Right the First Time. (2001) ISBN 0-7499-2285-0
- Scott Plous. The Psychology of Judgment and Decision Making (1993) ISBN 0-07-050477-6
