= Bernt P. Stigum =

Bernt Petter Stigum (born 10 September 1931) is a Norwegian economist.

He was born in Oslo and graduated from Oslo Cathedral School in 1949. Following military service and studies in various European countries, Stigum took the BA in economics at Dartmouth College in 1956, followed by the MA and PhD at Harvard University in 1958 and 1962, respectively. He played college soccer for the Dartmouth Indians.

Stigum was an intern at the MIT Sloan School of Management in 1961–1962, then assistant professor at Cornell University from 1962 to 1968. He became associate professor at the Northwestern University in 1968 and subseequently professor in 1970, before moving home to Oslo and serving as a professor economics at the University of Oslo from 1974 to 2001. His main field was mathematical economics. He was inducted into the Norwegian Academy of Science and Letters in 1988.
