= Howard Raiffa =

American academic (1924–2016)

- Born: January 24, 1924; New York City, US
- Died: July 8, 2016 (aged 92); Tucson, Arizona, US
- Education: University of Michigan
- Scientific career
- Workplaces: Columbia University; Harvard University
- Thesis: Arbitration Schemes for Generalized Two-Person Games (1952)
- Doctoral advisor: Arthur Herbert Copeland
- Doctoral students: Gordon M. Kaufman; Robert B. Wilson; Bernt P. Stigum; Richard Zeckhauser

Howard Raiffa (/ˈreɪfə/ RAY-fə; January 24, 1924 – July 8, 2016) was an American academic who was the Frank P. Ramsey Professor (Emeritus) of Managerial Economics, a joint chair held by the Business School and Harvard Kennedy School at Harvard University. He was an influential Bayesian decision theorist and pioneer in the field of decision analysis, with works in statistical decision theory, game theory, behavioral decision theory, risk analysis, and negotiation analysis. He helped found and was the first director of the International Institute for Applied Systems Analysis.

== Early life ==
Raiffa was born on Jan. 24, 1924 and attended Evander Childs High School. He first attended the City College of New York, before enlisting as a radar specialist in the United States Army Air Corps.

After serving for four years during World War II, Raiffa received a bachelor's degree in mathematics in 1946, a master's degree in statistics in 1947 and a PhD in mathematics in 1951, all from the University of Michigan.

== Career ==
- His 1961 book, Applied Statistical Decision Theory, co-written with Robert Schlaifer, introduced the idea of conjugate prior distributions.
- A lecture of his in the 1960s concerning the use of Bayesian methods for betting on horses gave John Craven USN, a US Navy scientist the idea of using Bayesian methods to search for a missing US Air Force hydrogen bomb lost near Palomares, Spain in the 1966 Palomares B-52 crash. Craven used the same methods again in the search for the lost submarine USS Scorpion in 1968. Raiffa has analysed situations involving the use of subjective probability and argues that subjective probabilities should follow the same rules (the Kolmogorov axioms) as objective, frequency-based probabilities.

Consider a situation in which you are required to gamble and are given two possible gambles.

Gamble A, in which you bet on the outcome of a fight between the world's greatest boxer and the world's greatest wrestler in a ring fight. (Assume you are fairly ignorant about martial arts and would have great difficulty making a choice of whom to bet on.) If your chosen champion wins you win $500 otherwise you get nothing. You place your choice in a sealed envelope, which is opened after the game.

Gamble B. Draw a ball from an opaque urn known to contain 50 orange and 50 blue balls. You will receive $500 if you draw an orange ball and nothing for a blue ball. The balls have been thoroughly mixed and you should assume that all balls are equally likely to be drawn. The draw takes place after the ring match is over.

Many people would feel more unsure about taking Gamble A in which the probabilities are unknown, rather than Gamble B, in which the probabilities are easily seen to be one half for each outcome.

Raiffa argues that a decision-maker should in fact assign a subjective probability of one-half to each outcome of Gamble A, provided that no information was available that makes one outcome more likely than the other.

Raiffa argues as follows. Suppose someone has the following preferences. If forced to take Gamble A they would bet on the boxer, but if given a free choice between the gambles they would prefer Gamble B. Presumably, such a person when allowed to choose Gamble A would prefer to simply bet on the boxer rather than toss a coin to decide the matter of whether they should bet on the boxer or the wrestler. But this randomised approach is equivalent to Gamble B. So, by the axioms of substitutability and transitivity for utilities, they should also prefer to bet on the boxer than on Gamble B. A similar argument can be used to show that when the player has no preference between the boxer and the wrestler he should also have no preference between Gamble A and Gamble B.

(The axiom of substitutability says that if someone is indifferent between outcomes A and B and indifferent between outcomes A and C, they should be indifferent between B and C. The axiom of transitivity says that if someone prefers outcome A to B and also prefers B to C, then they should prefer A to C.)

Others, such as Daniel Ellsberg disagree with Raiffa's reasoning and have devised alternative interpretations of decision theory. One of the most radical departures is Dempster-Shafer theory, which rejects the use of probability theory completely, in favour of a theory of belief functions, which do not satisfy the axioms of probability.

== Bibliography ==
- Motzkin, T. S.; Raiffa, H.; Thompson, G. L.; Thrall, R. M. (1953). "The double description method". Contributions to the theory of games. Annals of Mathematics Studies. Vol. 2. Princeton, N. J.: Princeton University Press. pp. 51–73. MR 0060202.
- Raiffa, Howard; Coombs, Clyde H.; Thrall, Robert M., eds. (1954). Decision processes. New York: Wiley. OCLC 639321.
- Luce, R. Duncan; Raiffa, Howard (1957). Games and decisions: introduction and critical survey. New York: Wiley. MR 0087572. Paperback reprint, Dover, New York
- Raiffa, Howard; Schlaifer, Robert (1970). Applied Statistical Decision Theory (PDF). Studies in Managerial Economics (5th ed.). Boston: Division of Research, Harvard Business School. ISBN 0-87584-017-5.
- Raiffa, H. (1968). Decision Analysis: Introductory Lectures on Choices Under Uncertainty. Addison-Wesley, Reading, MA.
- Keeney, R. L. and Raiffa, H. (1976). Decisions with Multiple Objectives: Preferences and Value Tradeoffs. Wiley, New York. Reprinted, Cambridge Univ. Press, New York (1993). MR0449476
- Raiffa, H. (1982). The Art and Science of Negotiation. Harvard Univ. Press, Cambridge, MA.
- Pratt, J. W., Raiffa, H. and Schlaifer, R. (1995). Introduction to Statistical Decision Theory. MIT Press, Cambridge, MA. MR1326829
- Hammond, J. S., Keeney, R. L. and Raiffa, H. (1998). Smart Choices. Harvard Business School Press, Boston.
- Raiffa, H. (2002). Negotiation Analysis. Harvard Univ. Press, Cambridge, MA.
- Raiffa, H., Richardson, J. and Metcalfe, D. (2003). Negotiation Analysis: The Science and Art of Collaborative Decision. Harvard Univ. Press, Cambridge, MA.
- Raiffa, H. (2011). Memoir: Analytical Roots of a Decision Scientist. CreateSpace Independent Publishing Platform ISBN 978-1461146926
