= Value tree analysis =

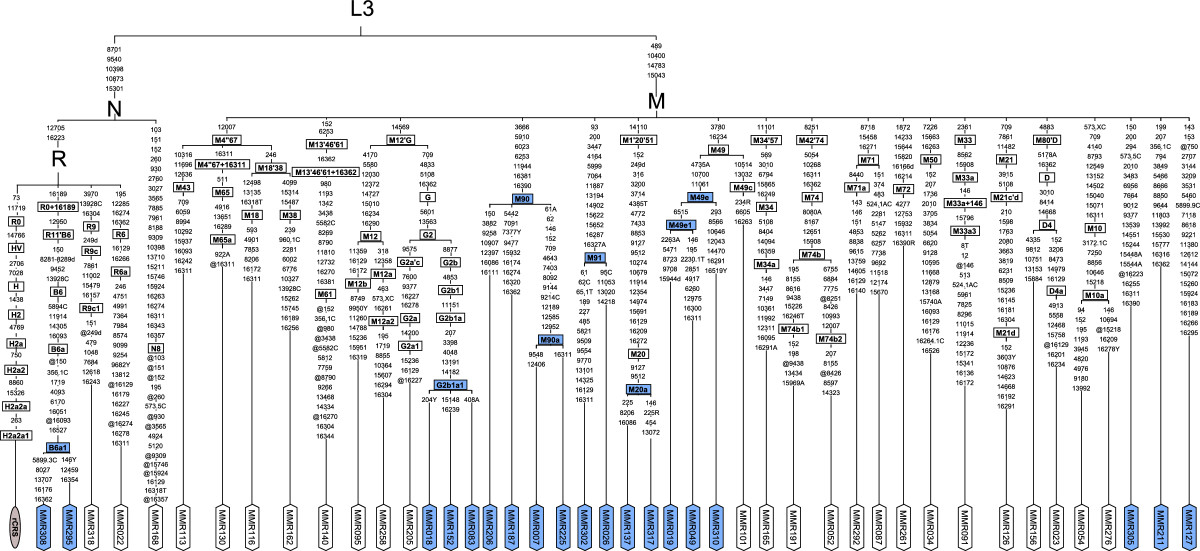
instance for Value Tree Analysis

Value tree analysis is a multi-criteria decision-making (MCDM) implement by which the decision-making attributes for each choice to come out with a preference for the decision makes are weighted. Usually, choices' attribute-specific values are aggregated into a complete method. Decision analysts (DAs) distinguished two types of utility. The preferences of value are made among alternatives when there is no uncertainty. Risk preferences solves the attitude of DM to risk taking under uncertainty. This learning package focuses on deterministic choices, namely value theory, and in particular a decision analysis tool called a value tree.

== History ==
The concept of utility was used by Daniel Bernoulli (1738) first in 1730s while explaining the evaluation of St Petersburg paradox, a specific uncertain gable. He explained that money was not enough to measure how much value is. For an individual, however, the worth of money was a non-linear function. This discovery led to the emergence of utility theory, which is a numerical measure that indicates how much value alternative choices have. With the development of decision analysis, utility played an important role in the explanation of economics behavior. Some utilitarian philosophers like Bentham and Mill took advantage of it as an implement to build a certain kind of ethics theory either. Nevertheless, there was no possibility of measuring one's utility function. Moreover, the theory was not so important as in practice. With the time past, the utility theory gradually based on a solid theoretical foundation. People started to use theory of games to explain the behavior of those who are rational and calm when engaging with others with conflict happening. In 1944 John von Neumann and Oskar Morgenstern's Theory of Games and Economic Behavior was published. Afterwards, it emerged since it has become of the key implement researchers and practitioners from statistics and operations research use to give a helping hand to decision makers when it was hard to make a decision. Decision analysts can be separated into two sorts of utility. The attitude of decision makers towards uncertain risk are solved by risk preference.

== Process ==
The goal of the value tree analysis process is to offer a well-organized way to think and discuss about alternatives and support subjective judgements which are critical for correct or excellent decisions. The phases of process of the value tree analysis is shown as below:

1. Problem structuring:
  - defining the decision context
  - identifying the objectives
  - generating and identifying decision alternatives
  - creating a hierarchical model of the objectives
  - specifying the attributes
2. Preference elicitation
3. Recommended decision
4. Sensitivity analysis

These processes are usually large and iterative. For example, problem structure, collection of related information, and modeling of DM preferences often require a lot of work. DM's perception of the problem and preferences for results not previously considered may change and evolve during this process.

== Methodology ==
Value tree was built to be an effective and essential technique for improving and enhancing goals and values by several aspects. The tree analysis displays a visual mode to problems that used to be only available in a verbal mode. Plus separate aspects, thoughts and opinions are united to a single visual representation, which gives birth to great clarity, stimulation of creative thinking, and constructive communication.

We take the steps below to create a value tree analysis with an example to help illustrate the steps:

Step1: Initial pool

Using a free brainstorming of all the values as a beginning, by which we mean all the problems which are related to the decision: the goals and criteria, the demands, etc.—all the things which have relevance to decision making. Write down what each value is on a piece of paper.

(A) Begin the process with several things:

- Essences in your decision
- The things that matter
- The thing that you are looking for
- The thing you want
- Your passions, intentions, joys, ambition
- The things which joy you
- The things that you are fierce of

(B) Once you've exhausted your thoughts after this very open phase, consider the following topics to help yu come up with comprehensive values, interests, and concerns related to your decision:

- Stakeholders

Consider who is affected by the decision and what their values might be. Stakeholders may be family, friends, neighbors, society, offspring or other species, but they can be anyone who might be affected by your decision, whether intentional or not.

- Basic human needs:
  - Physiological value - for example, health and nutrition
  - Safety value - feel safe
  - Social values - be loved and respected
  - Self-realizing value - doing and becoming "fit"
  - Cognitive value - eager to satisfy curiosity, know, explain and understand
  - Aesthetic value - experience beauty
- Intangible consequences. We are most inclined to ignore intangible consequences, such as:
  - If you make this choice, how would you feel about yourself?
  - How do others see you making this choice?

The lack of awareness of this intangible consequence can easily lead to our regretful decision. Moreover, if there is a disagreement between our intuitive and thorough analysis of decision-making, we are usually not aware of the underlying intangible consequences.

- The pros and cons of the options you have seen:
  - For each option you can think of, what are the best and worst aspects of yourself? These will be values.
  - Special consideration of costs and risks. We tend to start our plan by thinking about the positive goals we hope to achieve. Considering costs and risks requires extra effort, but considering them is the first step to avoid them.
- Future values
  - Consider future impacts and current impacts. People tend to ignore or mitigate future consequences.
  - Imagine your own future, perhaps in your death bed, reviewing this decision. What is important to you?

Step2: Clustering

When lacking of ideas, clustering the ideas is an efficient way to move the paper around until similar ideas are gathered together.

Step3: Labeling

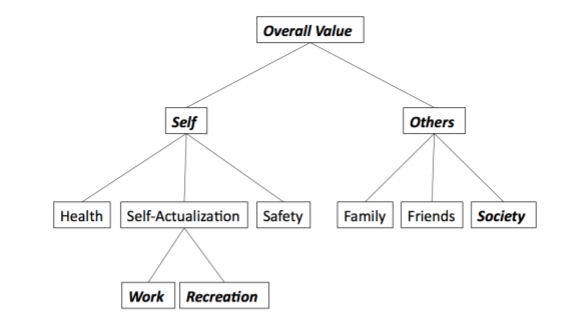
Example of creating Value Tree Analysis

Mark each group with a higher level value that holds them together to make each element clearer.

[Example]

As a simplified example, let us assume that some of the initial values we propose are self-determined, family, safe, friend and healthy. Health, safety and self-realization can be grouped together and labeled as "self", where families and friends can be grouped together and labeled as "other".

Step4: Moving up the tree

Seeing whether these groups can be grouped into still larger groups

[Example]

SELF and OTHERS group into OVERALL VALUE.

Step5: Moving down the tree

Also seeing if these groups can be divided into still smaller sub-groups.

[Example]

SELF-ACTUALIZATION could be divided into WORK and RECREATION.

Step6: Moving across the tree

Asking themselves is another valid way to bring new ideas to a tree, whether any additional thoughts at that level can come out(moving across the tree).

[Example]

In addition to FAMILY and FRIENDS, we could add SOCIETY.

The diagram on the right shows the final result of the (still simplified) example. Bold, italic indicates the basic values that were not originally written by us, but were thought of when we tried to fill in the tree.

== Tool ==
=== PRIME Decisions ===
PRIME Decisions is a decision helping implement which use PRIME method to analyze incomplete preference information. Novel features are also offered by PRIME Decisions, which gives support to interactive decision process which includes an elicitation tour. PRIME Decisions are seen as an essential catalyst for further applied work due to its practitioners benefit from M. Köksalan et al. (eds.), Multiple Criteria Decision Making in the New Millennium © Springer-Verlag Berlin Heidelberg 2001 166 the explicit recognition of incomplete information.

=== Web-Hipre ===
Web-HIPRE, a Java applet, provides help to multiple criteria decision analysis. Moreover, a normal platform is provided for individual and group decision making. People can process the model at the same time at any time. Plus, they can easily have access to the model. It is possible to define links to other websites. All other sorts of information like geography, media files describing the criteria or alternatives can be referred to this link, which help make a better quality of decision support significantly.

== Application ==
Some indicators obtained by process analysis are of great help to the value tree analysis. Especially in the value decomposition of internal operation indicators, the driving indicators of a first-level process indicator are usually the secondary sub-process indicators. For instance, the new product launch cycle (in terms of R&D project to production) is actually driven by two processes: R&D and testing in the company. The standardized R&D and testing process is a key success factor for improving the speed of innovation. To this end, the two process indicators development cycle, test cycle, sample acceptance and other indicators are the vital elements which drive the new product launch cycle indicators. Therefore, combining process analysis is of great significance for the decomposition of indicator value, especially for the decomposition of internal operational indicators. The instances of the main application areas are shown as below:

=== Application on business, production and services ===
==== Budget allocation ====
Allocating the engineering budget for products and projects annually is always a challenge. With value tree analysis aspects, such as strategic fit, which have no natural evaluation measure, but may have a significant role in decision-making can be included into the analysis. Furthermore, there is likelihood of communication being increased by explicit modelling of the relevant facts and a base for justified decisions is also provided.

==== Selection of R&D programs ====
As it is known to all that the risk in high in many R&D programs sometimes, thus the role of a good reason may be as essential as the decision itself. Value tree analysis offers a tool to give support to the reasoning of the selection of the R&D programme and modelling the facts affecting the decision.

==== Developing and deciding on marketing strategies ====
For instance, the analysis of new strategies for merchandising gasoline and other products through full-facility service stations.

=== Application on public policy problems ===
==== Analysis of responses to environmental risks ====
For instance, organization of negotiations between several parties in order to identify compromise regulations for acid rain and identify the objectives of the regulations.

==== Negotiation for oil and gas leases ====
Carry out an evaluation report of subcontractors and analyze the criteria which should be used.

==== Comparisons between alternative energy sources ====
For instance, organizing a debate about nuclear power, aiding the decision process, and studying value differences between the decision-makers.

=== Application on medicine ===
==== Helping individuals to understand the risks of different treatments ====
In addition to the decision-making problems value tree analysis serves also other purposes.

==== Quantification of subjective variables ====
For instance, a scale which measures the worth of military targets.

=== Application on empirical pilot study variable selection ===
As value tree analysis is an approach that costs and computes little, it is an optimal choice for time-sensitive variable selection in empirical pilot healthcare studies. Value tree analysis offers a structured and strategic process for decision-making so that pilot study and patient data constraints can be accounted for.

=== Application on Coaching ===
Value tree analysis help creative and critical thinking and organize the thoughts in a logical way. Moreover, when a decision has come up, value tree analysis can also be an effective way to think about one's core goals and values. Afterwards, we can actively look for decision opportunities with the analysis done before.

== Softwares ==
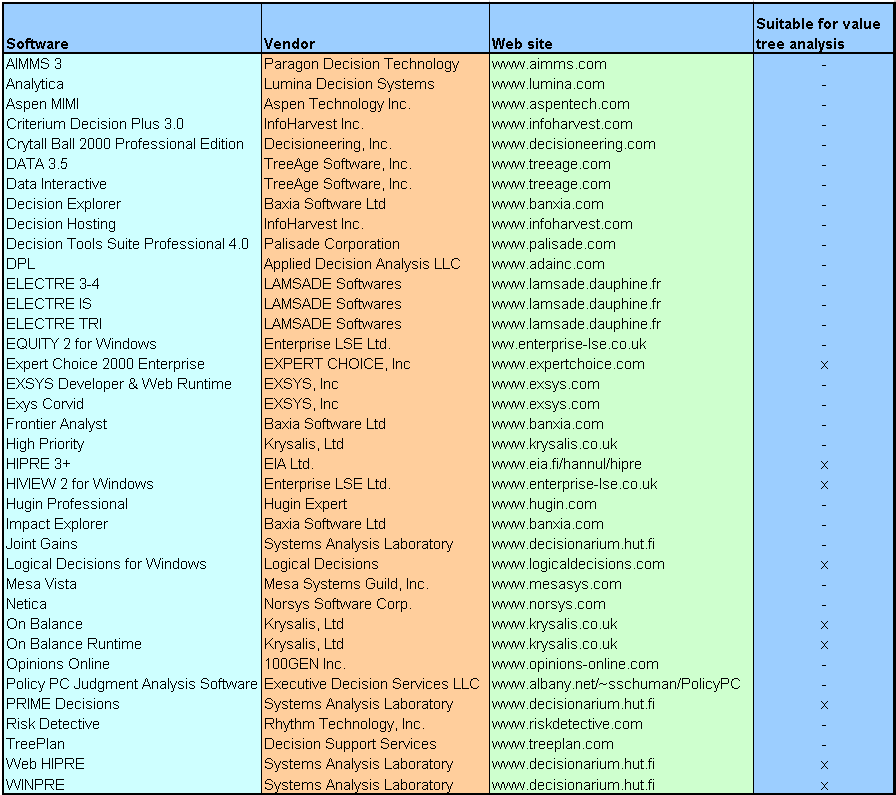
DA software tools and vendors

The software tools of value tree analysis are shown in the picture below:
