= Decision management =

Type of business management

Decision management, also known as enterprise decision management (EDM) or business decision management (BDM), entails all aspects of designing, building and managing the automated decision-making systems that an organization uses to manage its interactions with customers, employees and suppliers. Computerization has changed the way organizations are approaching their decision-making because it requires that they automate more decisions, to handle response times and unattended operation required by computerization, and because it has enabled "information-based decisions" – decisions based on analysis of historical behavioral data, prior decisions, and their outcomes.

== Overview ==
Decision management was described in 2005 as an "emerging important discipline, due to an increasing need to automate high-volume decisions across the enterprise and to impart precision, consistency, and agility in the decision-making process". Decision management is implemented "via the use of rule-based systems and analytic models for enabling high-volume, automated decision making".

Organizations seek to improve the value created through each decision by deploying software solutions (generally developed using BRMS and predictive analytics technology) that better manage the tradeoffs between precision or accuracy, consistency, agility, speed or decision latency, and cost of decision-making within organizations. The concept of decision yield, for instance, focuses on all five key attributes of decision-making: more targeted decisions (precision); in the same way, over and over again (consistency); while being able to adapt "on-the-fly" (business agility) while reducing cost and improving speed, is an overall metric for how well an organization is making a particular decision.

Organizations are adopting decision management technology and approaches because they need a higher return from previous infrastructure investments, are dealing with increasing business decision complexity, face competitive pressure for more sophisticated decisions and because increasingly short windows of competitive advantage means that the speed of business is outpacing speed of information technology to react.

Other terms used include "intelligent process automation" (where decision management is combined with business process management).

== Approach ==
There are a number of different approaches used to apply decision management principles. In general, these follow three steps:

1. Decision identification and decision modeling using either open standards such as Decision Model and Notation or proprietary approaches such as The Decision Model
2. Development of a system or service (often called a Decision Service) that automates all or part of the decision
3. Ongoing monitoring and management of the decision to keep the business rules and predictive analytics or machine learning models used up to date

Decision management often involves the use of A/B testing and experimentation as well.

== See also ==
- Business rules
- Predictive analytics
- Machine Learning
- Decision making software
- Decision engineering
