= Joanne N. Smith =

Haitian-American feminist and activist

Joanne Smith
- Education: Bowie State University (BA); Hunter College (MSW); Columbia University (MA)
- Occupations: Feminist, human rights advocate, social worker

Joanne Ninive Smith is a first-generation Haitian-American social worker and activist born and raised in New York City. She is the executive director and founder of the Brooklyn-based non-profit organization, Girls for Gender Equity. Smith has organized around the issues of gender equality, racial justice, school pushout, sexual harassment, police brutality, the criminalization of black girls in schools and violence against transgender and gender non-conforming people of color.

== Background ==
=== Education ===
In 1997, Smith received a bachelor's degree from Bowie State University and completed Louisiana State University's Pre-Doctoral Academy. She worked as a case manager at Rheedlan and as a Cobra Casework Supervisor at Brooklyn Aids Task Force before returning to school. In 2001, Smith became a Community Fellow for the Open Society Institute, now Open Society Foundations. In 2003, she received a Master of Social Work Degree from Hunter Graduate School of Social Work. In 2007, she received a degree in Non-Profit Management from Columbia Business School. Smith also completed post-graduate training at the Ackerman Institute of Family.

== Activism ==
=== Girls for Gender Equity ===
With the support of the Open Society Foundations, in 2001 Smith started Girls for Gender Equity in Sports with the mission to end gender inequality and gender-based violence. The organization changed its name to Girls for Gender Equity in 2003. Girls for Gender Equity works intergenerationally, through a Black feminist lens, to center the leadership of Black girls and gender-expansive young people of color in reshaping culture and policy through advocacy, youth-led programming, and narrative shift to achieve gender and racial justice.

==== National Agenda for Black Girls ====
A National Agenda for Black Girls was launched by Girls for Gender Equity and partner organizations in 2019, to build political momentum and center the voices and policy priorities of Black girls and gender expansive youth in the 2020 presidential election and beyond. Youth organizers have since created and distributed a Presidential Candidate Questionnaire, convened political education seminars, hosted culture-shifting events, published op-eds and policy memos, and participated in White House listening sessions to influence national policy. Youth organizers from A National Agenda for Black Girls helped inform the Gender Policy Council's National Strategy on Gender Equity and Equality, and are continuing to organize to promote the Protect Black Women and Girls Act and a Black Girl Bill of Rights.

=== Young Women's Initiative ===
Smith is the co-chair of the Young Women's Initiative (YWI). She felt that it was unfair that women and girls were left out of Mayor Bloomberg's 2011 Young Men's Initiative, so she responded by hosting town-hall meetings in New York City and a holding a National Listening Session on the needs of girls and women of color. These events were held to give women and girls a space to unite and discuss their personal experiences with racial discrimination, violence, and inequality, with the intention to show that their needs are just as pressing as the needs of boys and men of color. Smith's leadership helped facilitate a $35M commitment from government and philanthropy to invest in community-driven recommendations, including an initial $10 million investment from NoVo Foundation and the New York Women's Foundation to match New York City Council Speaker Melissa Mark-Viverito's $10 million contribution. Given its success, as of 2021, YWI has been codified and replicated across 9 localities, and at the White House Summit on the United States of Women in 2016, the National Collaborative of Young Women's Initiatives was launched.

=== Black Girl Freedom Fund ===
Launched on September 15, 2020, the anniversary of the 1963 Birmingham bombing that killed four little girls, the Black Girl Freedom fund is a 10-year initiative to invest one billion dollars into the advancement of Black girls and gender expansive youth by 2030. Recognizing that Black girls, femmes, and gender-expansive young people are often overlooked, erased, silenced, or simply not invested in, despite their position on the frontlines of fighting for gender and racial equity, a group of activists, educators, organizers and philanthropists came together to call attention to the crisis Black girls face in the US. Joanne N. Smith is a co-founder of the fund alongside Dr. Monique W. Morris (Grantmakers for Girls of Color), LaTosha Brown (Southern Black Women and Girls Consortium), Tarana Burke (‘me too.’ Movement), Fatima Goss Graves (National Women's Law Center), Dr. Salamishah Tillet (A Long Walk Home), Scheherazade Tillet (A Long Walk Home), and Teresa C. Younger (Ms. Foundation).

=== Surviving R. Kelly ===
Smith spoke out and organized in support of survivors in response to allegations of sexual abuse against rapper and hip hop artist R. Kelly. Smith was featured in Lifetime's documentary series Surviving R. Kelly as well as a panel discussion following the premier, and Girls for Gender Equity published a viewer guide for the show. The show and Smith's activism, alongside others, shifted the conversation about Black survivorship and increased awareness around the prevalence and impact of sexual abuse.

=== Move to End Violence ===
Smith was part of the first cohort of Movement Makers in NoVo Foundations’ Move to End Violence, a 10-year movement building program designed to strengthen the collective capacity to end gender based violence in the United States.

== Publications ==
In January 2011, Feminist Press published Smith's first book, Hey, Shorty!: A Guide to Combating Sexual Harassment and Violence in Schools and on the Streets (ISBN 9781558616691). Smith co-authored this book with Meghan Huppuch and Mandy Van Deven.

In October 2021, Joanne N. Smith was invited to author a book with the new gender-focused Moment of Lift Books publishing house, created by Melinda French Gates in collaboration with Flatiron Books. Expected in 2023, the book will discuss freedom dreaming with Black girls and gender-expansive youth.

=== Op-Eds and articles ===
- Smith, Joanne. (2002), Gay and Lesbian Foster Care and Adoption Information Pack for The National Resource Center for Foster Care and Permanency Planning at the Hunter College School of Social Work.
- Smith, Joanne. (Ed.) (2008), The Go Girl Go Project Official Coaches and Group Leaders Guide and Go Girls Guide to Life, from the Women's Sports Foundation.
- Smith, Joanne N. (2011), "Schoolgirls Can Find Protection in Title IX," Women's E-News.
- Smith, Joanne N. (2014), "Young Women of Color Break the Silence. Now What?" Women's E-News.
- Smith, Joanne. (2017), Resist School Pushout With and For Black Girls. Occasional Paper Series.
- Smith, Joanne N. (2020), "A Love Letter to Black Girls," Essence.
- Smith, Joanne N. (2020), "#MeToo Isn't Just for Adults," Essence.
- Smith, Joanne N. (2021), “We all know Gabby Petito's story. Can you name a missing Black girl?” The Lily.

== Honors and awards ==
In 2007 Smith was inducted in the New York City Hall of Fame. In 2012 she was named to the French American Foundation's Young Leaders Program. In 2013, she was named as one of New York's New Abolitionists. In 2016, Smith was honored at The New York Women's Foundation Celebrating Women Breakfast. In 2018 she was a Woman of Vision honoree at the Ms. Foundation 30th Annual Gloria Awards. In 2021, Smith was named among the Nonprofit Power 100: nonprofit leaders who are serving the most vulnerable New Yorkers.

Other awards include:

- 2006: The Union Square Award
- 2008: The Susan B. Anthony Award from NOW-NY
- 2008: The Educational Equity Center Rising Star Award
- 2010: The Stonewall Democratic Club's Stonewall Women's Award
- 2012: The New York Women's Foundation (NYWF) Neighborhood Leadership Award
- 2013: Choice USA's Generation 2 Generation Award
- 2015: The Shirley Chisholm Women of Distinction Award
- 2015: The Haitian Round Table's 1804 Haitian-American Change Maker Award
- 2016: NYWF Vision Award
- 2019: Brooklyn Community Foundation Spark Prize

== Public appearances ==
=== Documentary & Media Features ===
- 2012: The Daily Show with Jon Stewart
- 2014: Anita: Speaking Truth to Power Director Freida Lee Mock. Samuel Goldwyn Films.
- 2019: Pushout - The Criminalization of Black Girls in Schools. A feature-length documentary that takes a close look at the educational, judicial and societal disparities facing Black Girls. Inspired by the groundbreaking book of the same name by renowned scholar, Monique W. Morris, Ed.D.
- 2020: Surviving R Kelly Part II: The Reckoning: docuseries from Lifetime on Netflix.

=== Speaking Engagements ===
- 2011: Sex, Power and Speaking Truth: Anita Hill 20 Years Later Conference, Hunter College.
- 2012: "(In)visibility of Girls Like Us: Why Race and Class Matter" at Girls Are Not For Sale, CUNY Graduate Center.
- 2012: Panel to Celebrate International Women's Day and the 40th Anniversary of Title IX, Women's eNews & New York Liberty.
- 2014: Women's Media Center Live #98.
- 2014: Breaking Silence: A Hearing on Girls of Color, the African American Policy Forum.
- 2014: Why We Can't Wait: Lessons from Listening to Girls of Color.
- 2015: NY1 Online's Panel Talks New City Council Initiative to Help Young Women in 2015
- 2015: National Listening Session on Young Women of Girls of Color
- 2016: Black Girl Movement: A National Conference (panel moderator).
- 2016: The Future of the Movement: A Black Girls Bill of Rights, Grantmakers For Girls of Color.
- 2016: White House Summit on the United States of Women.
- 2016: Washington State Coalition Against Domestic Violence (WSCADV) Conference Plenary Speaker: Stories of Action.
- 2016: Race Forward's Facing Race National Conference: Mobilizing Black Women and Girls in the Movement for Black Lives.
- 2016: New York State Coalition Against Domestic Violence (NYSCADV) Prevention Summit Keynote Speaker: Centering girls of color within the racial and gender justice movement of the 21st Century.
- 2017: “BLACK GIRL VISION: Intergenerational Movement Building for Race & Gender Equity”, Annual Zora Neale Hurston Lecture at Columbia University.
- 2018: Nurturing Black Girl Genius, Anna Julia Cooper conference.[Source]
- 2018: United States of Women Summit: How to Stop the Prison Pipelines for Girls of Color.
- 2019: Surviving and Thriving panel with Melissa Harris Perry and Stacey Abrams joined by Deon Haywood, and Barbara Perkins, Power Rising.
- 2019: Grassroots Organizing in the Era of #MeToo (panelist), University of Pennsylvania Perry World House, The Alice Paul Center for Research on Gender, Sexuality & Women, Latin American and Latino Studies, and the Ortner Center on Violence & Abuse in Relationships.
- 2019: Lifetime Screening Of "Surviving R. Kelly Part II: The Reckoning".
- 2020: Boston Women's Foundation Conversation Series: Advancing Girls of Color 2021 and Beyond.
- 2020: Spark Change For Justice: #SayHerName, Brooklyn Community Foundation.
- 2020: “Gender Justice in Our Lifetime: What will it take?” Closing plenary speaker, Jahajee Sisters 2020 Indo-Caribbean Women's Empowerment Summit.
- 2021: 2nd Annual State of the People, We Rise plenary for the Office of the Public Advocate.
- 2021: It's the Legacy for Us: An Intergenerational Conversation with Anita Hill, Girls for Gender Equity.
