= MIT Disobedience Award =

United States award

The MIT Disobedience Award, given by the MIT Media Lab at Massachusetts Institute of Technology, was a $250,000 cash-prize award that recognized and honored the efforts of an individual or an organization whose ethical disobedience of authority resulted in a positive social impact. The award was active from May 2017 to September 2019, when it was cancelled after connections between the Media Lab and Jeffrey Epstein became public.

The physical award was a glass orb, fabricated by MIT Media Lab professor Neri Oxman.

The Disobedience Award was an international award, and individuals and organizations from all disciplines and specialties, including science, medicine, human rights, politics, law, journalism, and technology, were eligible for nomination.

== History ==
The Disobedience Award was created by former director of the MIT Media Lab Joi Ito and LinkedIn co-founder Reid Hoffman in July 2016. In July 2017, the Media Lab presented the Disobedience Award to recipients Marc Edwards and Mona Hanna-Attisha to honor their efforts in exposing high levels of lead in the water supply of Flint, Michigan during the Flint Water Crisis. In 2018, the annual award was presented to the founder of the #MeToo movement, Tarana Burke, and to BethAnn McLaughlin and Sherry Marts; who were recognized for activism in the #MeToo movement and the #MeTooSTEM movement, and for efforts in combating sexual harassment and misconduct in science and in academia.

In September 2019, one of the awards' jurors Anand Giridharadas resigned after news came out involving Ito's associations with Jeffrey Epstein. MIT gave orbs similar to the glass orb that was part of the prize to both Epstein and Hoffman.

== Recipients ==
Year	Name	Affiliation
2017	Mona Hanna-Attisha and Marc Edwards	Hurley Medical Center's Pediatric Residency Program and Charles Lunsford Professor of Civil Engineering
2018	Tarana Burke, BethAnn McLaughlin, and Sherry Marts	#MeToo and #MeTooSTEM Movements
