= GGE =

GGE may refer to:

- Ecuato Guineana, the national airline of Equatorial Guinea;
- Gasoline gallon equivalent;
- Georgetown County Airport, in South Carolina, United States;
- Girls for Gender Equity, an American advocacy group;
- Gurr-Goni language, spoken in Australia;
- Grande galerie de l'Évolution, a building at the Jardin des Plantes in Paris, France.
