= Sherry Marts =

American consultant on sexual harassment and academic

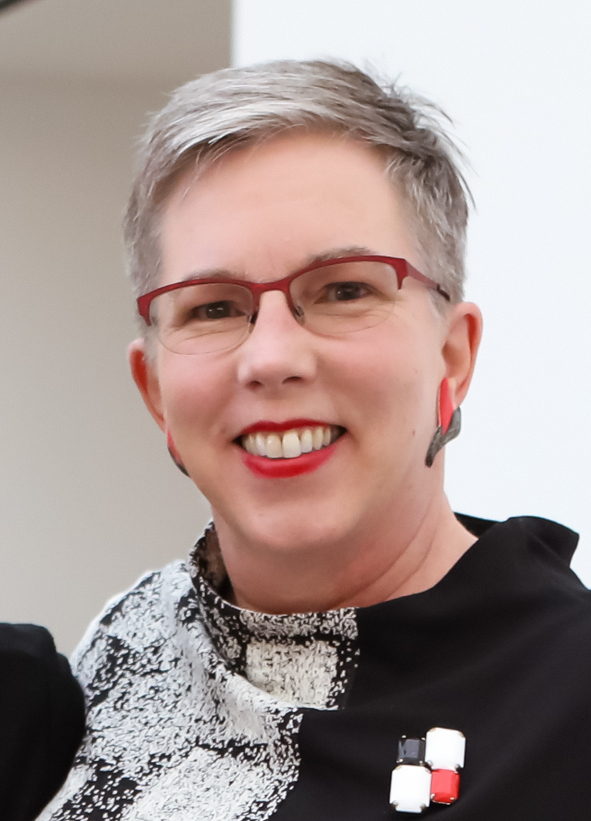
- Marts in 2018
- Education: B.Sc. in Applied Biology from the University of Hertfordshire, Ph.D. in Physiology from Duke University
- Occupation: consultant
- Known for: research in genetics, advocacy against sexual harassment

Sherry Marts is an American consultant on sexual harassment and academic who advises scientific associations on how to address and ameliorate institutionalized sexual harassment. While Marts was a PhD student at Duke University, working in cell biology, she experienced serious sexual harassment.

At Duke University, she was the co-chairperson of the Graduate and Professional Student Council (GPSC), an organization that she helped to found.

She spent 10 years in Washington, D.C., at the Society for Women’s Health Research, where she was the vice president for scientific affairs.

In 2018 Marts shared an MIT Disobedience Award, given to individuals who fight sexual harassment, with BethAnn McLaughlin and Tarana Burke. In 2020 Marts stopped associating with McLaughlin and stopped using the #MeTooSTEM hashtag.

In September 2019 she was appointed executive director of the Genetics Society of America.

== Selected publications ==
- Dana, Raven; Marts, Sherry (2013). The Book of How: Answers to Life's Most Important Question. Bird & Beverage Press. ISBN 9780989311724.
- Becker, Jill B.; Arnold, Arthur P.; Berkley, Karen J.; Blaustein, Jeffrey D.; Eckel, Lisa A.; Hampson, Elizabeth; Herman, James P.; Marts, Sherry; Sadee, Wolfgang; Steiner, Meir; Taylor, Jane; Young, Elizabeth (1 April 2005). "Strategies and Methods for Research on Sex Differences in Brain and Behavior". Endocrinology. 146 (4): 1650–1673. doi:10.1210/en.2004-1142. hdl:2027.42/49483. PMID 15618360.
