= Mandy Van Deven =

American writer (born 1980)

- Born: March 23, 1980 (age 46); Athens, Georgia, United States
- Website: mandyvandeven.com

Mandy Van Deven is a philanthropic advisor, public intellectual, and writer. She is a contributor to Inside Philanthropy and Nonprofit Quarterly, has a chapter in Liberation Stories: Building Narrative Power for 21st Century Social Movements, co-authored “Hey, Shorty! A Guide to Combating Sexual Harassment and Violence in School and on the Streets” (2011) and was the editor of Polyphonic Feminisms: Acting in Concert. She has written for The Center for Effective Philanthropy, Salon, The Guardian, Refinery29, GlobalPost, Marie Claire (India), and Newsweek.

== Background ==
Van Deven was raised in Athens, Georgia and attended Georgia State University in Atlanta, where she got involved in social justice activism and independent media, including Clamor Magazine and Altar Magazine She moved to New York City in 2003 and became a community organizer at Girls for Gender Equity (GGE). She was part of the feminist blogosphere in the early 2000s and was the founder of Elevate Difference. She has a Master of Social Work (Organizational Management and Leadership) from the Silberman School of Social Work at Hunter College.

== Career ==
Van Deven has written about many topics, including philanthropy, narrative infrastructure and power building, making humanitarian aid more accountable to local communities, poverty in America, women's safety in public spaces, and global health.

She was the guest editor of the Summer 2010 issue of Barnard Center for Research on Women's online journal, “The Scholar & Feminist Online.” The issue was entitled Polyphonic Feminisms: Acting in Concert.

In 2011, she co-authored “Hey, Shorty! A Guide to Combating Sexual Harassment and Violence in School and on the Streets” with Girls for Gender Equity's founder and executive director, Joanne N. Smith, and former director of community organizing, Meghan Huppuch.

Van Deven has spoken to audiences throughout the United States, including at Barnard College and Sarah Lawrence College. She has been featured in The Philanthropist Journal, Philanthropisms podcast, Salon, In These Times, Progressive Radio, and Alternet.

== Selected bibliography ==
- “Hey, Shorty! A Guide to Combating Sexual Harassment and Violence in School and on the Streets” (2011). Feminist Press.
