= Stop Sexual Assault in Schools =

United States non-profit organization

- Founded: 2015
- Founder: Esther Warkov and Joel Levin
- Type: 501(c)(3)
- Headquarters: Seattle
- Region served: United States
- Website: stopsexualassaultinschools.org

Stop Sexual Assault in Schools is a United States non-profit organization that advocates for K–12 students’ right to an education free from sexual harassment and sexual assault. Sexual assault and severe or pervasive sexual harassment are types of sex discrimination prohibited under Title IX of the Education Amendments of 1972, a civil rights law that prohibits sex discrimination in any education program that receives federal funding. SSAIS accomplishes its mission by creating and distributing free education programs, filing pro bono civil rights complaints with the Office for Civil Rights (OCR), collaborating with national gender equity organizations, supporting legislative and legal initiatives, working with communities and families to bring schools into Title IX compliance, and educating the media about how sexual harassment and sexual violence in K–12 schools can violate students’ rights.

== Founding ==
SSAIS is the first national nonprofit organization created solely to address sexual harassment and assault in K–12 schools. It was founded in 2015 by two parent educators, Drs. Esther Warkov and Joel Levin, whose family member was reportedly raped on a Seattle public school field trip in 2012. The parents led a high-profile effort to hold the district accountable for its failure to recognize the victim’s federally mandated Title IX rights. Their Title IX complaint, and the media attention it attracted, resulted in community protests that compelled the Seattle school district to commission a community task force, reform its sexual harassment policy, comply with Title IX directives, and improve its safety procedures on school field trips. After learning how pervasive sexual harassment is in K–12 schools nationwide, Warkov and Levin launched the stopsexualassaultinschools.org website in September 2015 as a comprehensive resource for K–12 families. President and CEO of the National Women’s Law Center, Fatima Goss Graves, wrote an inaugural blog post for the website launch.

== History ==
Media reports about SSAIS in the Washington Post, Huffington Post, Women’s eNews, Slate, Broadly, NEAToday, and NPR affiliates have increased awareness of the pervasiveness of peer and educator sexual harassment and assault in K–12 schools. In 2016, SSAIS joined the National Coalition for Women and Girls in Education and contributed to their comprehensive report Title IX at 45. In March 2016, the Office of the Vice President invited SSAIS to advise on strategies to address K–12 sexual violence. In the same year, SSAIS received an American Association of University Women Community Action Grant to create a free comprehensive video and Action Guide, Sexual Harassment: Not in Our School! The video and companion materials were released in November, 2016.

== Initiatives ==
The SSAIS website maintains comprehensive resources for parents and students about sexual harassment and sexual violence occurring in K–12 schools, with free educational materials informing communities about Title IX and how to hold schools accountable for providing safe learning environments for all students.

SSAIS provides families with pro bono support for filing complaints with the U.S. Department of Education Office for Civil Rights. These efforts have resulted in federal investigations of K–12 schools in Washington, Oregon, Michigan, Georgia, and Texas. SSAIS also offers resources to families whose students have experienced sexual harassment and sexual assault in schools.

SSAIS creates advocacy opportunities for youth, sexual assault survivors, and families. It also unites advocates through its Coalition Against Sexual Harassment K12 (CASHK12).

SSAIS has supported legislative initiatives and amicus briefs that uphold students’ civil rights.

In January, 2018, SSAIS launched the MeTooK12 campaign to promote awareness and inspire action to counteract pervasive sexual harassment and sexual violence in K–12 schools.
