= New York Women's Foundation =

American charitable organization

The New York Women's Foundation (NYWF) is a 501c3 charitable organization in New York City that works to bring economic security, end gender-based violence, and provide health access and reproductive justice to all women and girls. It describes itself as a "cross-cultural alliance that ignites action and invests in bold, community-led solutions across the city."

== History ==
The Foundation was established in 1987. It was co-founded by Gloria W. Milliken and Helen LaKelly Hunt. By 2007, it was giving away a million dollars a year. In 2008, it was slated to give away $2.75 million. In 2011, Ana Oliveira was president of the New York Women’s Foundation. In February 2013 it received a grant of $750,000 from Walmart. In April 2013, it released a report that found that women in New York are 30% more likely to die in childbirth than they were 12 years prior.

In 2018, The Foundation announced the launch of the Fund to Support the Me Too Movement in partnership with Me Too Movement Founder and Leader Tarana Burke with an initial $1 million in seed funding. In October 2018, the Fund gave out its first round of grants to eight organizations across the nation that are working to end gender-based violence and help survivors of sexual violence heal and find their strength as leaders. The groups, chosen in consultation with #MeToo founder Tarana Burke, are focused on marginalized and underserved communities, including immigrant communities and communities of color as well as LGBTQ people.

== Fundraising and public events ==
The Foundation organizes recurring fundraising events that support its grantmaking and highlight individuals and organizations engaged in gender equity and social justice work.

=== Celebrating Women® Breakfast ===
The Celebrating Women® Breakfast is the Foundation’s primary annual fundraising event. It recognizes leaders from philanthropy, advocacy, arts, sports, and community organizing whose work aligns with NYWF’s mission.

=== Neighborhood Dinner ===
The annual Neighborhood Dinner is a borough-based fundraising event recognizing community and nonprofit leadership across New York City. The 30th annual dinner was held in the Bronx in 2024, and the 2025 event took place in Brooklyn.

=== Radical Generosity Dinner ===
The Radical Generosity Dinner is an annual fundraising event that centers philanthropy, arts, and social justice. The 2023 dinner honored artist Bisa Butler, activist Molly Gochman, and community leader Lorelei Williams.
