= Esther Warkov (activist) =

American activist and researcher

- Education: Estancia High School
- Alma mater: University of Wales (MA); University of California (BA); University of Washington; Hebrew University of Jerusalem (PhD)
- Known for: Co-Founder & Executive Director of SSAIS

Esther Warkov is an American activist and researcher who has authored books and articles on music and ethnomusicology. She and her husband Joel Levin co-founded a national nonprofit Stop Sexual Assault in Schools (SSAIS).

== Activism ==
Warkov and Levin started SSAIS in 2015 after their family member was raped on a school field trip. The nonprofit educates K-12 students and parents about Title IX protections and how to advocate for safe schools free from the damaging effects of sexual harassment and assault. As the first national nonprofit dedicated to educating the public about K-12 sexual harassment, SSAIS drew wide national attention, appearing in over 200 media reports. In January 2018, SSAIS launched the #MeTooK12 spinoff of the #MeToo movement to raise awareness of the widespread prevalence of sexual harassment in K-12 schools.

== Musical research ==
Warkov has published many scholarly articles, recordings, articles, and reviews on how music is related to society, especially music from Irish, Welsh, and Middle Eastern cultures. Her work is featured on the Jewish Music Research Centre website. Her music research and musical recordings have been cited in several academic books and papers.

== Biography ==
Warkov graduated from high school when she was 16 and has three music degrees: a bachelor's degree in music from the University of California, a Fulbright scholar with a master's degree in music from the University of Wales, and also a doctorate in ethnomusicology from Israel with a specialty in Middle Eastern music. She has received many fellowships and awards, including a National Endowment for the Arts grant for 'ud study. For many years she also worked as an independent music instructor.
