= MeTwo movement =

2018 anti-racism hashtag

#MeTwo is a hashtag created in mid-2018 in response to criticism and hate mail directed at Turkish-German footballer Mesut Özil after he posed for a photo with Turkish President Recep Tayyip Erdogan. The hashtag campaign was launched by social activist , who encouraged those affected by racism in Germany to use it in their tweets to draw attention to the extent of racist harassment and racist attacks. Since then, this hashtag has been used thousands of times in Germany. International media also reported on this hashtag, which is based on the #MeToo movement. "MeTwo" was chosen to draw attention to the fact that one can also have two nationalities, and Can cited Özil saying "I have two hearts, one German and one Turkish" as an influence.

== Origin ==
Ali Can opened the "hotline for concerned citizens" to fight racism as a result of the rise of right-wing populist forces in Europe. Later, with the hashtag "MeTwo", he wanted to draw attention to the increasing racism of everyday life. After the Mesut Özil debate on racism, who raised serious accusations against the DFB and civil society, the hashtag gained wide recognition. The hashtag was shared a thousand times and met with a broad response in national and international media.
