= Girls for Gender Equity =

American non-profit organization

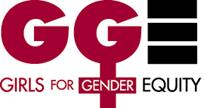
- Type: Nonprofit
- Industry: Advocacy group
- Founded: 2001 (24 Years Ago) in Brooklyn, NY
- Founder: Joanne N. Smith
- Headquarters: Brooklyn, New York, United States
- Area served: United States

Girls for Gender Equity (GGE) is an American non-profit organization based in Brooklyn, New York. It was founded by Joanne N. Smith, who is also their Executive Director.

== Programs and initiatives ==
GGE's after-school and youth organizing programs aim to provide education, resources, and information for youth in their schools and communities.

=== Sisters in Strength (SIS) ===
Sisters in Strength (SIS) is a two-year social justice education program for Black girls between the ages of 15 and 18 who are survivors of gender-based violence. It is a paid internship, where each participant works with a student in a Master of Social Work degree program.

In one project, SIS participants learned about Title IX's interdiction of gender-based discrimination and the requirement for New York schools to have a Title IX coordinator to ensure compliance. Participants then conducted a project where they called 200 New York City schools, asking if they had a Title IX coordinator. They presented the results of their study to the New York City Department of Education.

On April 28, 2016, Joanne N. Smith presented the Black Girl Bill of Rights to the Congressional Caucus on Black Women and Girls during its first symposium at the Library of Congress, Washington, D.C..

=== The Coalition for Gender Equity in Schools (CGES) ===
The mission of the Coalition for Gender Equity in Schools (CGES) is to end sexual harassment and violence in schools by empowering young people to speak up and fight against negative, normalized behavior, including offensive or harmful comments, LGBTQ discrimination, and unwanted or non-consensual touches. GGE is the lead organizer of this alliance of students, teachers, parents, and other school community members who are focused on changing the culture of schools and creating a sense of community that is rooted in mutual respect.

=== Urban Leaders Academy ===
Urban Leaders Academy (ULA) is an after-school program which aims to advance the values, ethics, determination, and leadership skills of junior high school students.

=== Young Women's Initiative (YWI) ===
In 2015, GGE played a role in helping the New York City Council create the Young Women's Initiative (YWI) as a counterpart to the Young Men's Initiative. This latter was started in 2011 by Mayor Michael Bloomberg to offer equal opportunities to Black and Latino men and boys in southeast Queens, northern Manhattan, the South Bronx, and Staten Island's North Shore. In a press release, City Council Speaker Melissa Mark-Viverito called YWI "the first coalition in the United States to tackle the systemic gender-based inequality."

== Media coverage ==
=== Anita documentary ===
GGE's Sisters in Strength appeared in Freida Mock's 2013 documentary Anita in a segment that featured their efforts on gender issues. The film tells the story of Anita Hill's fight against sexual harassment in the workplace and her testimony against U.S. Supreme Court Nominee Clarence Thomas.

=== NY1 ===
On October 22 2015, Joanne N. Smith discussed a new City Council initiative to help young women with a special panel, including Errol Louis, City Council Speaker Melissa Mark-Viverito, Ana Oliveira from the New York Women's Foundation, and Danielle Moss Lee from the YWCA of New York City.

=== Melissa Harris-Perry ===
On May 20, 2012, several of GGE's youth organizers joined Melissa Harris-Perry on a panel to discuss the different forms of feminism. On August 19, 2012, GGE's Natasha Adams joined Melissa Harris-Perry to discuss negative campaigning during the 2012 election cycle and the ways young people were reacting. On November 24, 2012, GGE Youth Organizer Emily Carpenter, of Girls For Gender Equity, joined Melissa Harris-Perry to discuss what President Obama's second term meant to her as a young Black woman.

On May 20, 2016, Melissa Harris-Perry was a guest on the 2016 Power Players week of Jeopardy! and played in support of Girls for Gender Equity.

=== The Daily Show with Jon Stewart ===
On April 17, 2012, Joanne Smith was featured on a segment of The Daily Show with Jon Stewart.

== Awards and honors ==
=== Awards ===
Joanne N. Smith - list of awards for work with GGE
Date	Award	Awarding Body	Details	Ref
October 16, 2012	Neighborhood Leadership Award	New York Women's Foundation		
May 23, 2013	New York's New Abolitionists		For her support in fighting against human trafficking.	
March 20, 2015	Shirley Chisholm Women of Distinction award		Awarded at the Brooklyn Public Library Central Branch by City Council Members Jumaane D. Williams and Laurie A. Cumbo in honor of her work in public service.	
March 21, 2015	Haitian American Changemaker	Haitian Round Table 1804	For making influential changes in her community.	
2016	The Amtrak Pioneer Award		For African Americans who have made positive contributions to communities in Brooklyn.	

=== Recognition ===
In 2012, Joanne Smith was recognized by the French American Foundation's Young Leaders Program for her work.

In 2013, GGE's Community Organizer Nefertiti Martin and Youth Organizer Emily Carpenter were included in the 4th annual Grio Top 100 African American History Makers list for "embodying the notable traits of their generation: creativity, fearlessness, and a powerful belief that each individual can change the world."

On February 26, 2016, Joanne Smith was recognized by Black Women's Blueprint at their annual Mother Tongue Monologue: A Praise Song for Black Girls Reclaiming Our Mother's Bones for her work at GGE.
