= Member and Employee Training and Oversight On Congress Act =

The Member and Employee Training and Oversight On Congress Act, abbreviated as the Me Too Congress Act, was a bill put forward to Congress on 15 November 2017 by Rep. Jackie Speier (D-Calif.) and Sen. Kirsten Gillibrand (D-N.Y.). It was in response to the Weinstein effect being felt in the political sphere of America. On November 29, the bill was passed by the United States House of Representatives. On December 7, 2017, Speier announced that the bill had 110 co-sponsors.
