= Farah Tanis =

American feminist activist

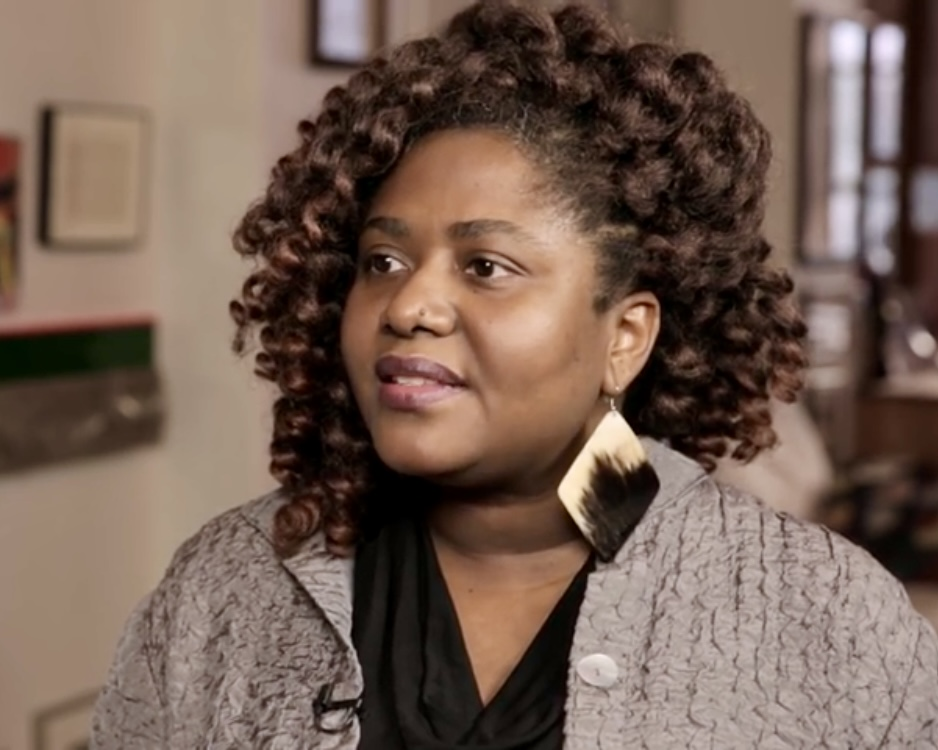
Tanis in 2017

Farah Tanis is a New York City–based feminist activist and co-founder and executive director of the Black Women's Blueprint and of the Museum of Women's Resistance. She is the chair of the US Truth and Reconciliation Commission on Black Women and Assault. She attended the 2017 Women's March to raise awareness on the trafficking of black women. Having experienced physical and sexual abuse as a child, Tanis began working in activism on behalf of women around 1993, running a women's shelter before founding Black Women's Blueprint. She was one of the organizers of the 2017 March for Black Women in Washington D.C.

Earlier in her career, Farah co-founded Dwa Fanm, a Haitian women's organization based in Brooklyn, and served as its executive director.

== Publications ==
An Open Letter from Black Women to the SlutWalk
