= BethAnn McLaughlin =

Scientific researcher

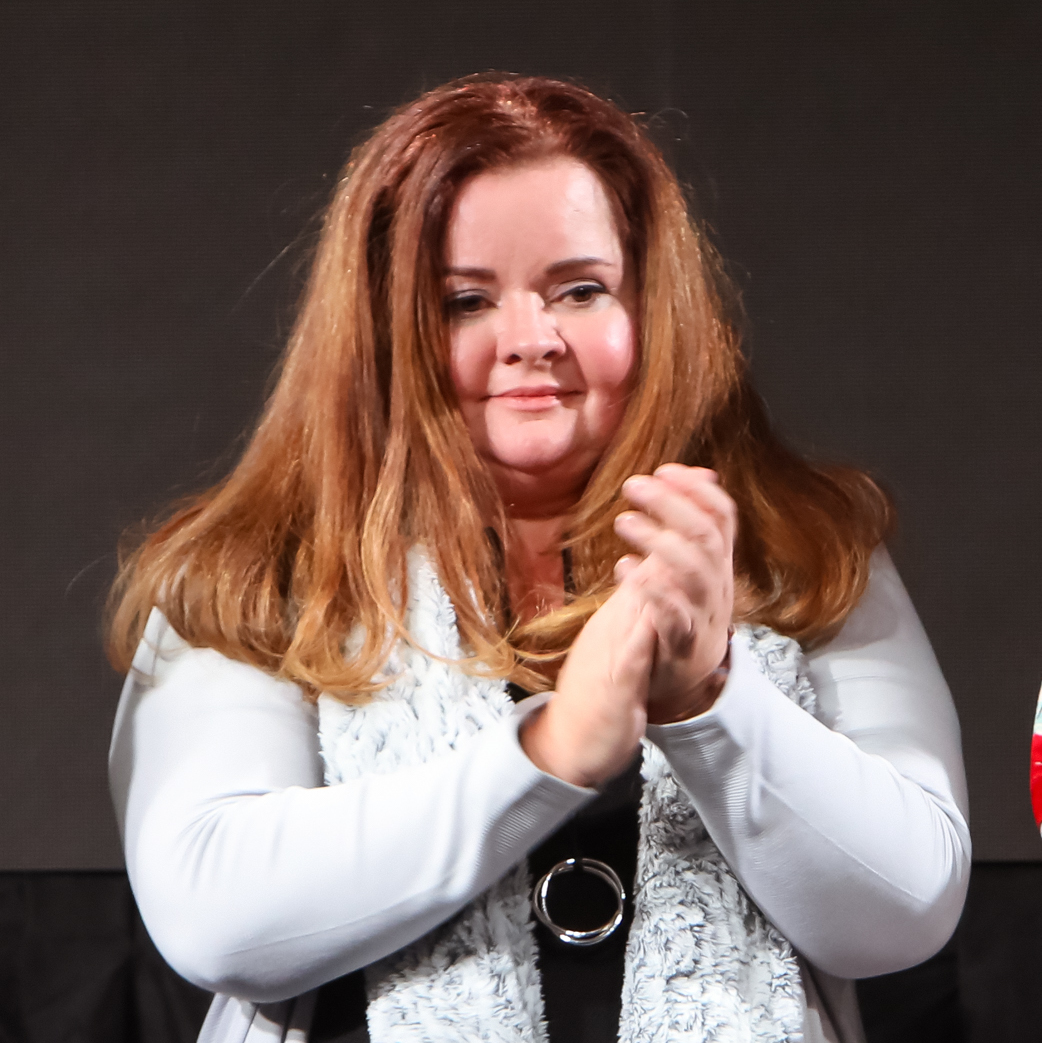
- McLaughlin in 2018
- Born: Boston, Massachusetts
- Education: Skidmore College; University of Pennsylvania
- Children: 2
- Scientific career
- Fields: Neurology
- Workplaces: Vanderbilt University
- Thesis: Striatal vulnerability to mitochondrial inhibition (1998)

BethAnn McLaughlin is an American neuroscientist, activist, and hoaxer. She is a former assistant professor of neurology at Vanderbilt University. Her research at Vanderbilt focused on neural stress responses and brain injury.

McLaughlin worked at MeTooSTEM, the non-profit organization she founded in order to advise scientists who are victims of sexual harassment. McLaughlin's management style has been questioned by several leaders of MeTooSTEM after several resignations, and allegations of bullying and mistreatment surfaced.

McLaughlin was suspended from Twitter in August 2020 for running a "years-long Twitter identity scam, wherein she allegedly pretended to be a bisexual, Native American anthropology professor at Arizona State University." McLaughlin soon after admitted responsibility for the hoax.

== Early life and education ==
McLaughlin was born in Boston and raised in St. Louis and New Hampshire. She had an early interest in nature and science but was not as engaged in "formal science classes", in contrast to her brother who took to academic studies more readily. McLaughlin describes her brother as gifted, particularly in math, but the academic pressure "looked miserable" so she leaned more towards sports. During high school, McLaughlin was involved with the school newspaper and worked as a waitress.

McLaughlin obtained a Bachelor of Arts in Biopsychology from Skidmore College in 1990. During this time she spent a year in Africa studying wildlife management which inspired her to advocate for nature through organising campus events for Earth Day; she credits the success of this event as the point when she became "...hopelessly committed to causing good trouble." McLaughlin obtained her PhD in the Neurological Sciences from the University of Pennsylvania in 1998.

After graduation, she continued her postdoctoral training in the Department of Neurobiology at the University of Pittsburgh. As a postdoc, she received a National Institutes of Health grant awarded through the National Institute of Neurological Disorders and Stroke's National Research Service Award Postdoctoral Training Fellowship in Neurodegeneration.

== Career ==
In 2002, McLaughlin joined Vanderbilt University as a research assistant professor at the Vanderbilt University Medical Center, a non tenure track position. In 2005, McLaughlin received a new appointment at the same institution as an assistant professor, a tenure track position.

Her research team studied how the brain responds to stress so that therapeutic solutions can be developed for acute and chronic injuries. The McLaughlin Lab also looked into identifying new genes that affect vulnerability to injury and the reasons behind cell death. Their research focused on stroke, Parkinson's disease, Alzheimer's disease and autism. Specifically, McLaughlin focused on understanding cell loss post hypoxic and ischemic insults (often in cardiac arrest and stroke).

McLaughlin has collaborated with researchers in physics and chemistry to study organoids for drug screening, cholesterol in the brain, and sensitive sensors for metabolic signalling.

McLaughlin applied for tenure in 2015, but Vanderbilt delayed a decision on her application for two years while a disciplinary investigation was conducted. The disciplinary investigation was based on accusations that McLaughlin was sending derogatory tweets to colleagues, from anonymous, multiuser Twitter accounts. She admitted to sending threats to colleagues, though does not recall if the specific threats of stabbing a colleague were specifically authored by her. She was denied tenure at Vanderbilt in 2017. After being denied tenure, she sought to have the decision overturned. She appealed the decision by filing a grievance with the university, and started a petition garnering social media support for her tenure. However, the decision to deny tenure was upheld, and her employment at Vanderbilt ended in July 2019.

== Activism against sexual harassment in science ==
In June 2018, McLaughlin and Julie Libarkin created the website MeTooSTEM.com to share stories about discrimination and sexual misconduct in science, technology, engineering, and mathematics. This included her own experience as a witness for a Title IX case which she described as "arcane, unfair...vicious..and there is zero justice at the end and zero transparency." McLaughlin states that she believes listing abusers and speaking out will reduce the pressure on academics to self-investigate potential sexual harassers, such as "...vet[ting] your new boss through the whisper net to see if they have sexually assaulted someone because there is no public record of most of these things."

McLaughlin called on the National Academy of Sciences (NAS) and the American Association for the Advancement of Science to set consequences for members participating in sexual assault or misconduct through petitions.

In June 2018, McLaughlin launched a campaign on social media to stop the red chili pepper "hotness" rating for professors at RateMyProfessors.com. The campaign received nearly 4,000 signatures and RateMyProfessors dropped this rating within 72 hours.

In an August 2018 interview with The Scientist magazine, she claimed credit for causing the Herpetologists' League to revoke their Distinguished Herpetologist award to Richard Vogt, saying attendees who had "a lack of confidence" complained to her about material in Vogt's acceptance presentation showing students in bikinis. However, McLaughlin was not present at the meeting, and herpetologists who were at the meeting immediately expressed their concern about sexual harassment issues.

In November 2018 McLaughlin used social media to highlight efforts from university professors to bar a computer scientist from speaking at a conference because of known sexual harassment allegations.

In an interview with the Journal of Cell Biology, McLaughlin asserted her belief that her involvement in advocacy has had negative impacts on her research, citing time spent away from the lab due to the long process that harassment cases undergo where safety is also of concern. She also stated that she has "demonstrably lost promotions, funding, and students because I've pulled awards out of the hands of harassers."

As of 2019, McLaughlin works at MeTooSTEM, the non-profit organisation that she founded in order to advise scientists who are victims of sexual harassment. On August 4, 2020, following a scandal on Twitter, McLaughlin wrote that she is "stepping away from all activities with MeTooSTEM to ensure that it isn't unfairly criticized for my actions."

== Bullying allegations under MeTooSTEM ==
From the founding of MeTooSTEM in 2018, through 2020, several leadership members of MeTooSTEM had resigned and raised concerns about McLaughlin's leadership. These included accusations of "bullying" people within and outside the organization, hostility, harassment, and marginalization of people of color. This included Sherry Marts, who shared the 2018 MIT Disobedience Award with McLaughlin, writing that she experienced "bullying and intimidation". Other concerns involved a lack of transparency over the direction, structure, and finances of MeTooSTEM. Some board members defended McLaughlin, with Carol Greider stating in 2019, "Much of her effectiveness has been in bringing truth to power and being in your face." As of 2019, the organization had a small board and group of regular volunteers. After McLaughlin's suspension from Twitter, she wrote in a statement that she is "stepping away from all activities" with the organization.

In August 2020, the @MeTooSTEM Twitter account was also restricted by the platform.

== Twitter hoax ==
On July 31, 2020, McLaughlin posted on Twitter that her colleague, "@Sciencing_bi", supposedly a female Indigenous anthropology professor at Arizona State University (ASU), had died of COVID-19. She claimed the woman contracted COVID-19 after "[s]he was forced by her university to continue teaching in person until April", though ASU had suspended classes in March 2020. The anonymous account was created in 2016 and had been heavily involved with MeTooSTEM.

After McLaughlin held a Zoom memorial service, attendees noticed that no one knew the account's true identity. A spokesperson for ASU later said the university had no evidence that any professors had died, or that the professor in question existed. An instance resurfaced wherein @Sciencing_bi had solicited donations over Venmo, and the Venmo account belonged to McLaughlin. On August 3, 2020, McLaughlin's Twitter account was suspended for violation of its "spam and platform manipulation policies" which prohibit maintaining fraudulent personas on the platform. Shortly afterwards, the @Sciencing_bi account was suspended under the same policy.

On August 4, 2020, the New York Times published a statement from McLaughlin provided by her lawyer in which she admitted responsibility for the hoax, and would be "stepping away" from MeTooSTEM. She was subsequently removed from the editorial board of the Journal of Neuroscience.

McLaughin was also subsequently removed from the MIT Media Lab 2018 MIT Disobedience Award, which she had originally shared with biologist Sherry Marts and founder of the #MeToo movement Tarana Burke.

== Recognition ==
In 2018 she received the Society for Neuroscience Louise Hanson Marshall Special Recognition Award for her work on the advancement of women in neuroscience.
