= Tarana Burke =

American activist (born 1973)

- Burke in 2024
- Born: September 12, 1973 (age 53); New York City, U.S.
- Education: Alabama State University; Auburn University at Montgomery (BA)
- Occupations: Activist, organizer, author
- Years active: 1989–present
- Organizations: me too. International, Just Be Inc.; Girls for Gender Equity; 21st Century Youth Leadership Movement; National Voting Rights Museum
- Movement: metoo (#metoo)
- Website: me too. International – official website

Tarana Burke (born September 12, 1973) is an American activist from New York City who started the MeToo movement. In 2006, Burke began Me Too as a youth program for junior and high school students with the goal of addressing the rampant sexual violence in the community. Over a decade later, in 2017, #MeToo became a viral hashtag when Alyssa Milano encouraged women to tweet the words if they had experienced abuse and harassment in the wake of the Harvey Weinstein sexual abuse cases. The phrase and hashtag quickly developed into a broad-based, and eventually international viral movement.

Time named Burke, among a group of other prominent activists dubbed "the silence breakers", as the Time Person of the Year for 2017. Burke founded me too. International in 2018 as a container for the movement and serves as Chief Vision Officer.

In 2020, Harvard University published a case study on Burke.

== Early life and education ==
Burke, a native of The Bronx, New York, attended Catholic primary school and Herbert H. Lehman High School. Her passion for community organizing began in the late 1980s when, as a young girl, she joined a youth development organization called 21st Century Youth Leadership Movement. She attended Alabama State University, a historically Black institution and later Auburn University at Montgomery . While in college, she organized press conferences and protests focused on racial justice. She has spearheaded initiatives addressing issues such as racial discrimination, housing inequality, and economic justice.

== Career ==
An activist since 1989, Burke moved to Selma, Alabama, in the late 1990s after graduating college.

After working with survivors of sexual violence, Burke developed the nonprofit "Just Be Inc" in 2003, which was an all-girls program for Black girls aged 12 to 18. In 2006, Burke founded the MeToo movement and began using the phrase "Me Too" to raise awareness of the pervasiveness of sexual abuse and assault in society.

In 2008, she moved to Philadelphia and worked at Art Sanctuary Philadelphia and other non-profits. She was a consultant for the 2014 Hollywood movie Selma, based on the 1965 Selma to Montgomery voting rights marches led by James Bevel, Hosea Williams, Martin Luther King Jr. and John Lewis.

Burke was a senior director at Girls for Gender Equity. Burke is a featured speaker at numerous public events across the country. Burke published two instant New York Times Best Sellers: You Are Your Best Thing: Vulnerability, Shame Resilience, and the Black Experience (co-authored with Brené Brown for Random House, April 2021) and Unbound: My Story of Liberation and the Birth of the Me Too Movement (Flatiron Books, September 2021). She is currently the Co-Founder and Chief Vision Officer for me too. International.

== Activism ==
=== Just Be Inc. ===
In 1997, Burke met a girl named Heaven in Alabama who told her about being sexually abused by her mother's boyfriend. She says she didn't know what to say, and never saw the girl again. She says she wished she had said "me too." Burke has said she came to believe girls needed "different attention" than their male peers. This and other incidents led Burke to found Just Be Inc., an organization that promotes the wellness of young female minorities aged 12–18. In 2006, she made a Myspace page. Just Be Inc. received its first grant in 2007.

=== Girls for Gender Equity ===
As of December 2017 Burke was the Senior Director of Girls for Gender Equity in Brooklyn, which strives to help young women of color increase their overall development through various programs and classes.

=== MeToo movement ===
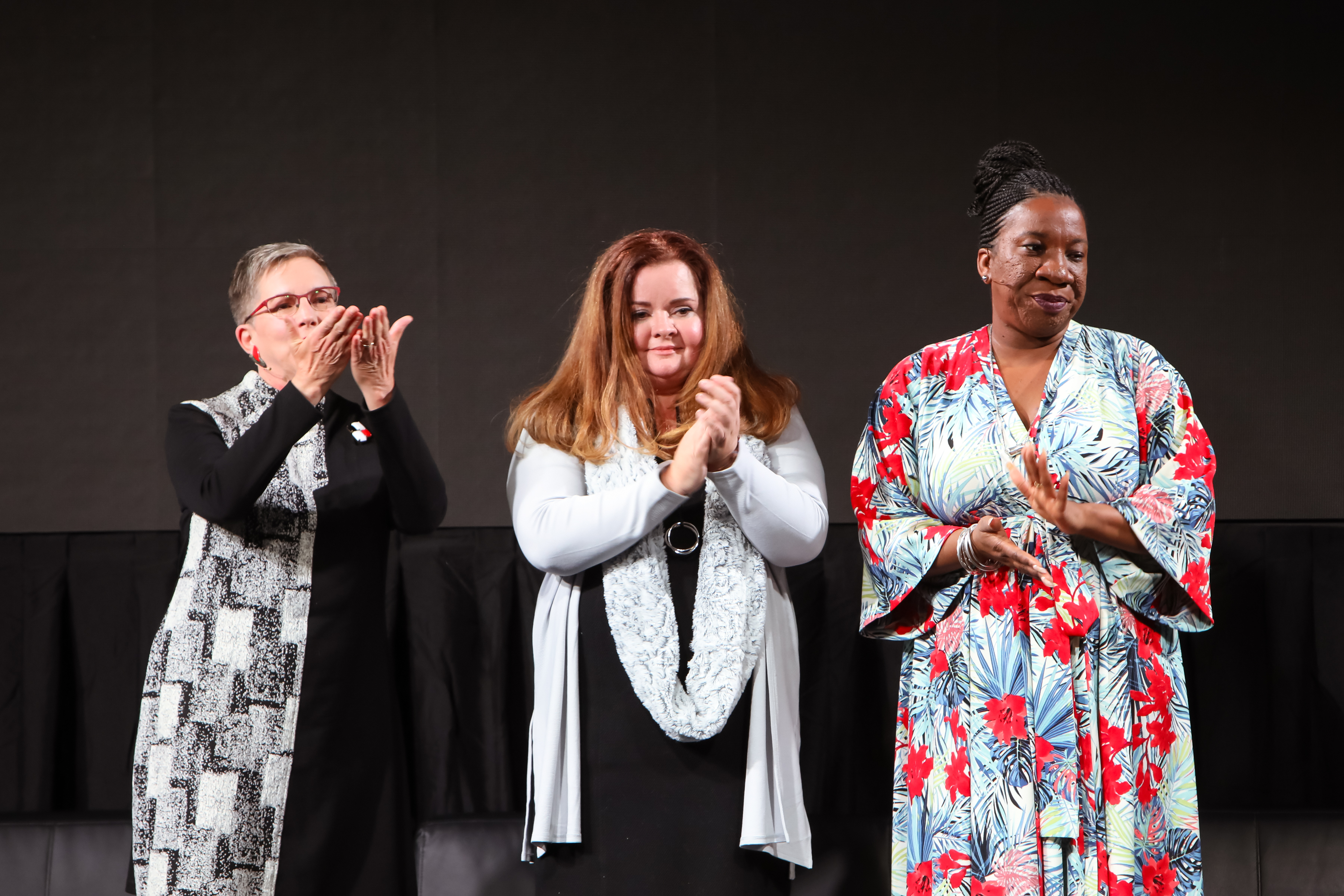
2018 Disobedience Awards at the MIT Media Lab. Sherry Marts, BethAnn McLaughlin and Tarana Burke

In 2006, Burke founded the MeToo movement and began using the phrase "Me Too" to raise awareness of the pervasiveness of sexual abuse and assault in society.

The phrase "Me Too" developed into a broader movement following the 2017 use of #MeToo as a hashtag following the Harvey Weinstein sexual abuse allegations. In October 2017, actress Alyssa Milano encouraged women to say "Me Too" if they've experienced sexual harassment or assault, and the hashtag became popular. Milano quickly acknowledged Burke's earlier use of the phrase on Twitter, writing "I was just made aware of an earlier #MeToo movement, and the origin story is equal parts heartbreaking and inspiring". Burke has been supportive of the #MeToo hashtag.

Time named Burke, among a group of other prominent activists and sexual abuse survivors dubbed "the silence breakers", as the Time Person of the Year for 2017. Her speaking engagements have included Brown University in February 2018 and at Calvary Episcopal Church (Pittsburgh) about the roots of the movement.

In 2021, Burke published a memoir describing the relationship of her activism to experience with leaders of the civil rights movement titled: Unbound: My Story of Liberation and the Birth of the Me Too Movement.

== Honors and awards ==
- 2017: Time, Time Person of the Year
- 2018 Time, 100 Most Influential People of 2018
- 2018: The Ridenhour Prizes, The Ridenhour Prize for Courage
- 2018: SheKnows Media, the VOTY (Voices of the Year) Catalyst Award
- 2019: Trailblazer Award winner
- 2022: BBC 100 Women
