= Elizabeth Dunn =

Canadian social psychologist

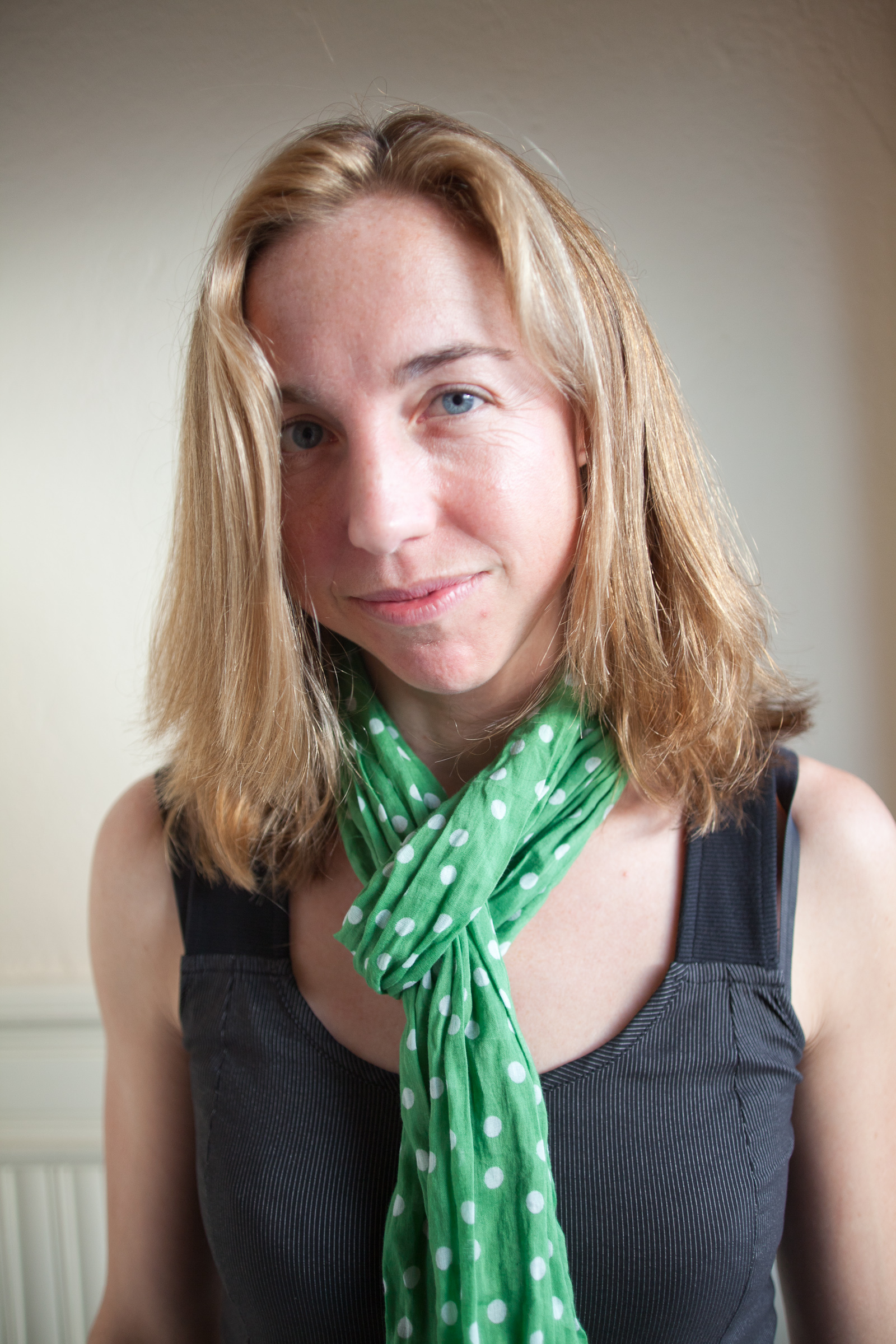
- Dunn in 2011
- Born: 1978 (age 47–48)
- Occupation: Professor

Academic background
- Education: BA., Harvard University; MA., PhD, University of Virginia
- Thesis: Misunderstanding the affective consequences of everyday social interactions: the hidden benefits of putting one's best foot forward (2004)
- Academic advisor: Daniel Gilbert

Academic work
- Discipline: Social Psychology
- Sub-discipline: Happiness
- Institutions: University of New South Wales; University of British Columbia
- Doctoral students: Lara Aknin
- Website: https://dunn.psych.ubc.ca

Elizabeth Warren Dunn is a Canadian social psychologist and a Professor of Social Psychology at the University of British Columbia (UBC). In 2015, Dunn was elected a member of the College of New Scholars, Artists and Scientists within the Royal Society of Canada.

== Education ==
Dunn conducted her undergraduate studies at Harvard University. While there, she worked under Daniel Gilbert, who inspired her to study and understand human happiness. As a graduate student, she was inspired to study how couples' happiness changed with each other and with strangers.

== Career ==
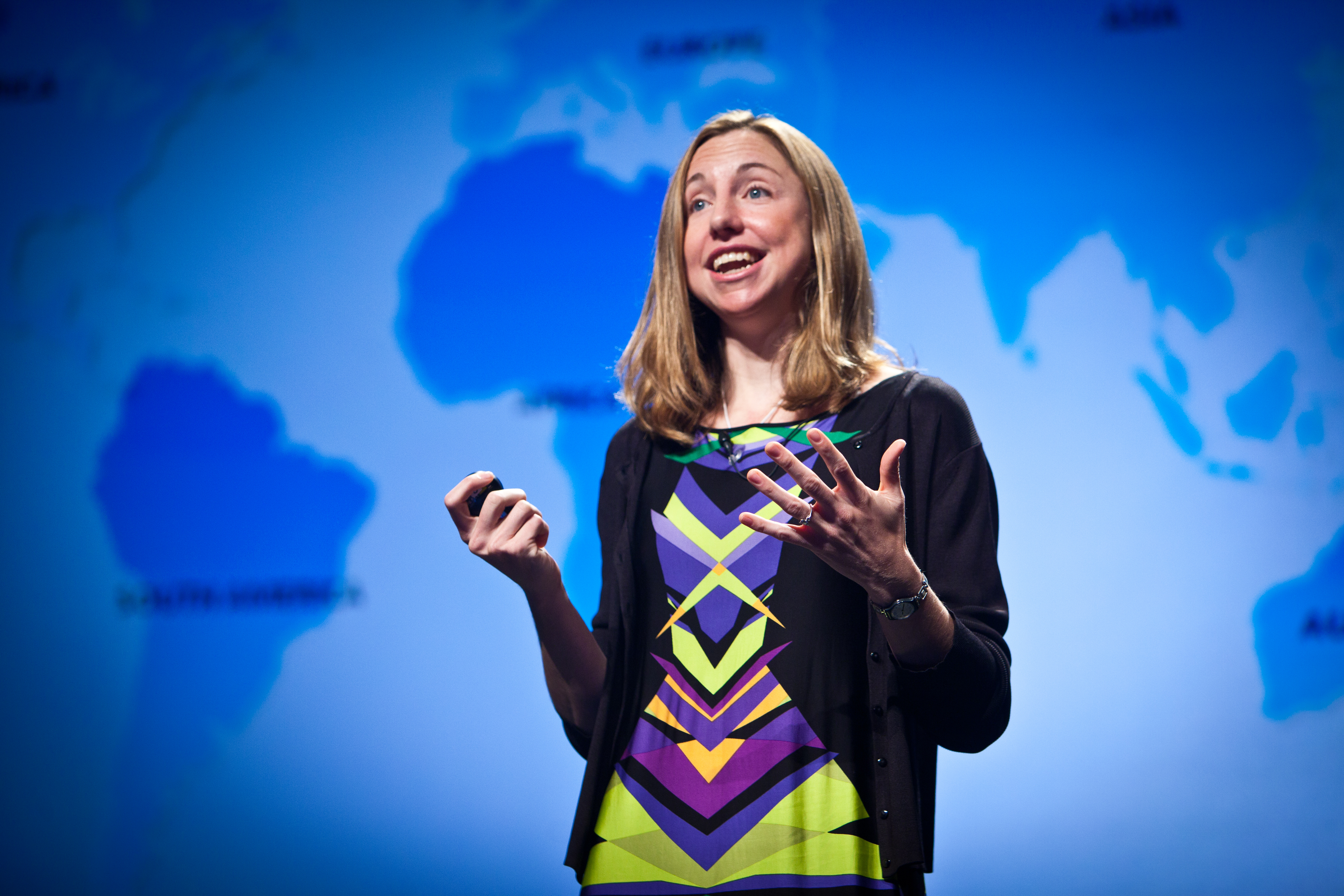
Dunn in 2010 at PopTech

After conducting her postdoctoral research, she joined the University of British Columbia (UBC) faculty in 2005.

In 2008, she co-authored and published a study in Science which found that humans find giving to others rewarding and it increases their happiness levels. Dunn and her team surveyed 109 UBC students who said they would hypothetically spend money on themselves rather than otherwise. However, once actually given the money, her team discovered they were happier spending it on others. Two years later, Dunn received a New Investigator Award from the Canadian Institutes of Health Research and UBC’s Robert E. Knox Master Teacher Award.

In 2012, she published "Giving Leads to Happiness in Young Children" with J. Kiley Hamlin and Lara Aknin, which supported the idea that humans may have evolved to find giving rewarding. The next year, Dunn co-authored and published "Happy Money: The New Science of Smarter Spending" with Michael Norton.

In 2015, Dunn was elected a member of the College of New Scholars, Artists and Scientists within the Royal Society of Canada. She was also named a Social Sciences and Humanities Research Council of Canada (SSHRC) Impact Award Finalist.

In 2019, she gave a TED talk. TED curator Chris Anderson listed it as one of his favourites of 2019.
