= Ernesto Sirolli =

Italian author and public speaker

Dr. Ernesto Sirolli
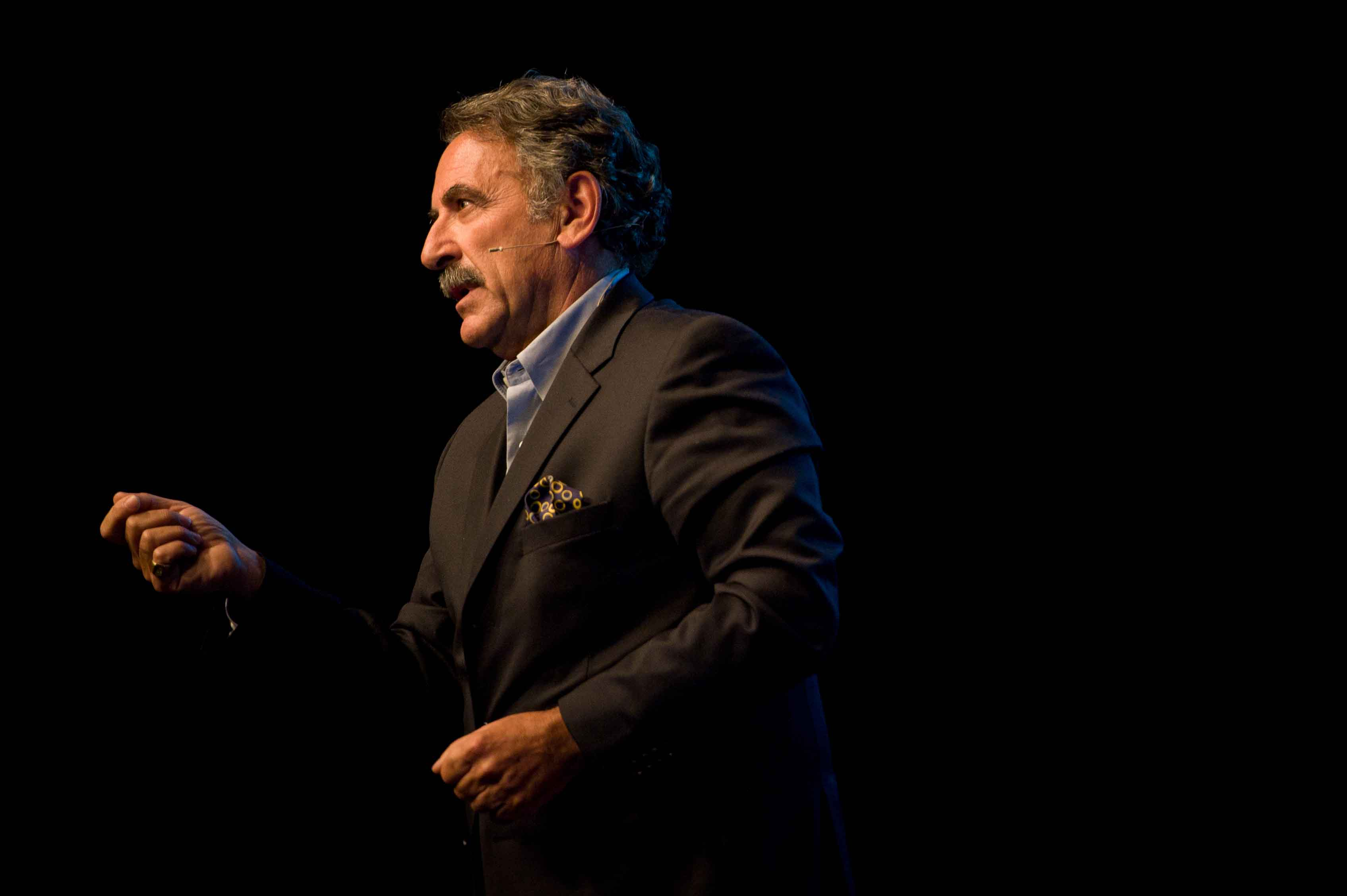
- Born: September 22, 1950 (age 76); Altino, Abruzzo, Italy
- Education: Laurea di Dottore in Political Sciences from Rome University (1976) and Ph.D in Local Enterprise Facilitation from Murdoch University, Australia (2004)
- Organization: Sirolli Institute for International Enterprise Facilitation
- Known for: Enterprise Facilitation® creation, and TED talk "Shut up and Listen"
- Notable work: "Ripples from the Zambezi" (1995 and 1999) and "How to Start a Business and Ignite Your Life" (2012)

Ernesto Sirolli (born September 22, 1950) is an Italian author and public speaker with expertise in the field of local economic development. He is the author of two books, Ripples from the Zambezi (1995 and 1999) and How to Start a Business and Ignite your Life (2012).

== Early life and education ==
Ernesto Sirolli was born in Italy and spent part of his childhood in Libya. He then studied political science at Rome University and received a Ph.D. from Murdoch University in Perth, Western Australia, in 2004.

== Career ==
Ernesto Sirolli began his career at an Italian foreign service NGO in Africa. In 1985, he founded the Sirolli Institute for International Enterprise Facilitation, to provide project implementation and Enterprise Facilitation training for organizations worldwide.

Sirolli is the author of two books. Ripples from the Zambezi: passion, entrepreneurship, and the rebirth of local economies, first published in 1995 and re-edited in 1999. This book is listed as required reading for several university courses on business and sustainable development. His second book, titled How to start a business and ignite your life: a simple guide to combining business wisdom with passion, was published in 2012.

Ernesto Sirolli is a visiting professor at the Curtin University Sustainability Policy Institute and an industry fellow at the University of Queensland Centre for Social Responsibility in Mining.

As a public speaker, Ernesto Sirolli gained international attention in 2012 with his TEDx talk "Shut Up and Listen". The presentation received over 3 million views and was included in Chris Anderson's book "TED Talks: The Official TED Guide to Public Speaking". Sirolli has also spoken at NPR radio, SDPB radio, and at several other TEDx conferences.

In 2016, Ernesto Sirolli received The IOEE International Lifetime Achievement Award for Entrepreneurship Education at the House of Lords in London.

== Books ==
- Sirolli, Ernesto (1995). Ripples In The Zambezi: Passion, Unpredictability And Economic Development. Institute For Science And Technology Policy, Murdoch University. ISBN 978-0869054000
- Sirolli, Ernesto (1999). Ripples from the Zambezi: passion, entrepreneurship, and the rebirth of local economies. British Columbia: New Society. ISBN 086-5713979. OCLC 54675326.
- Sirolli, Ernesto (2012). How to start a business and ignite your life : a simple guide to combining business wisdom with passion. Garden City Park, New York: Square One, 2012. ISBN 978-0757003745. OCLC 826659061.
