= Harry Marks (broadcast designer) =

British-American broadcast designer (1931–2019)

- Born: March 11, 1931; England
- Died: April 21, 2019 (aged 88); Pebble Beach, California, U.S.
- Occupation: broadcast designer
- Children: 2

Harry Marks (March 11, 1931 – April 21, 2019) was a British-American broadcast designer who was renowned for his work in American television graphics. In 1984, Marks originated the idea for the TED Conference, which he co-founded with Richard Saul Wurman.

== Biography ==
=== Early life ===
Marks was born in England. When he was 15, he worked for Oxford University Press as a typographer and publications designer. At the age of 18, he immigrated to San Francisco, where he worked for the University of California Press. He eventually went to work for ABC in the 1960s, assigned to make on-screen graphics more attractive. Marks would eventually do work for CBS and NBC as well.

=== ABC Movie of the Week intro ===
Marks created the groundbreaking intro for the ABC Movie of the Week. He hired Douglas Trumbull to create the graphics using the slit-scan process that Trumbull had created for the psychedelic climax of 2001: A Space Odyssey. Most of his work through the 1970s used backlit animation multi-pass techniques, although Marks was one of the early adopters of CGI animation.

=== 1977–78 ABC "Still the One" fall season promo ===
Marks began making fall season promos for ABC in 1969. In 1977, ABC felt they could not afford to film a promotional campaign for their upcoming TV season. Marks took the initiative to create one on his own. He was inspired by Toni Tennille rehearsing a pop rendition of the Orleans song, "Still the One," and used that phrase as the theme of the promo. His team asked people on the street in various cities to give a "number one" hand gesture or a thumbs-up gesture and filmed them for a cinéma vérité style. These were combined into a fast-paced montage with various shots of "1" or "one" on items such as billboards, signs, clothing, and vehicles. With the exception of brief clips from older shows at the beginning of the promo, no TV personalities were visible. The promo cost $60,000 in total. ABC was impressed by the promo and asked Marks to make more, but insisted that subsequent campaigns feature the stars of ABC's prime time shows. Costs skyrocketed in the following years with the need for ancillary support for the actors – such as makeup, wardrobes, and transportation – as well as production crews. Marks continued to make promos for ABC through the 1982–83 "Come On Along" campaign. In 1984, 1985, and 1990, Marks worked on fall season promos for NBC.

His later TV work includes graphics and title sequences for NBC News Today, The Wonderful World of Disney and for prime-time movies such as the NBC Sunday Night Movie. He also created idents for all of the networks and WWOR-TV.

=== Creating the TED Conference ===
With his personal history of using computers, CGI, and other technology in his projects, Marks had the idea to bring together all the people from various fields of technology, entertainment and design who worked together on projects. He discussed the concept with Richard Saul Wurman and they would co-found the TED Conference in 1984.

== Awards ==
In 1983, Marks received an Emmy Award for Outstanding Individual Achievement for his opening graphics for Entertainment Tonight. He received the first Lifetime Achievement Award given by the Broadcast Designers Association.

== Death ==
Marks retired in 2005 and died in 2019.
