= Jeanny Yao =

Canadian biochemist, technology entrepreneur

- Education: Magee Secondary School
- Alma mater: University of Toronto
- Occupation(s): biochemist and technology entrepreneur
- Organization(s): Environmental and Physical Sciences Students Association
- Known for: Co-founder of Novoloop and identification of a bacteria that breaks down phthalates

Jeanny Yao is a Canadian biochemist, technology entrepreneur and environmentalist. She jointly identified a bacteria that breaks down phthalates and co-founded Novoloop (formerly BioCellection, Inc.), a sustainable materials startup company that aims to turn plastic waste into high-performance materials that can be used in a variety of products.

== Biography ==
Yao and Miranda Wang attended Magee Secondary School in Vancouver, British Columbia. Following a visit to Vancouver South Waste Transfer Station with their school environmental club in Grade 10, Yao and Wang became interested in combating the issue of plastic waste.

Yao and Wang entered the Sanofi BioGENEius Canada Competition in 2012. Their competition participation allowed them to work with the help of mentors, University of British Columbia professor Lindsay Eltis, Dr. Adam Crowe, and Dr. James Round, to discover bacteria in British Columbia's Fraser River that could eat phthalates. When they were 17-years-old, Yao and Wang presented their research findings on plastics degradation and upcycling at the TED2013 conference: "The Young. The Wise. The Undiscovered."

Yao studied a BSc in biochemistry and environmental science at the University of Toronto. During her studies, Yao was a member of the Environmental and Physical Sciences Students Association.

In 2015, Yao and Wang co-founded the company BioCellection Inc., now Novoloop, in Menlo Park, Silicon Valley, before they finished their undergraduate degrees. They took part in, and won, numerous entrepreneurial competitions and programs, raising US$5 million in capital between 2015–2019 to fund the sustainable materials startup company.

Yao is the first-named inventor of all Novoloop patents and works as Chief Operating Officer. They eventually pivoted away from using a biological approach to degrade plastics. In 2017, Novoloop was awarded $25,000 as the runner-up in the Urban Resilience Challenge. In February 2022, Novoloop raised US$11 million in Series A funding to support the scaling of its recycling technology and build a larger processing facility. To help the company scale, Novoloop also partnered with the cities of San José, along with GreenWaste Recovery.

Yao was selected by Plan Canada as one of the Top 20 Under 20 in 2014 and is a recipient of the Penn-Columbia Social Impact Fellowship (2016). Forbes magazine recognized Yao and Wang in 2019, naming them to its 30 under 30 social entrepreneurs list. Yao and Wang were also the subject of the documentary In Love With A Problem (2021) by Julie Kim, which was a finalist at the New York Wild Film Festival.
