= Magee Secondary School =

Coordinates: 49.229°N 123.152°W

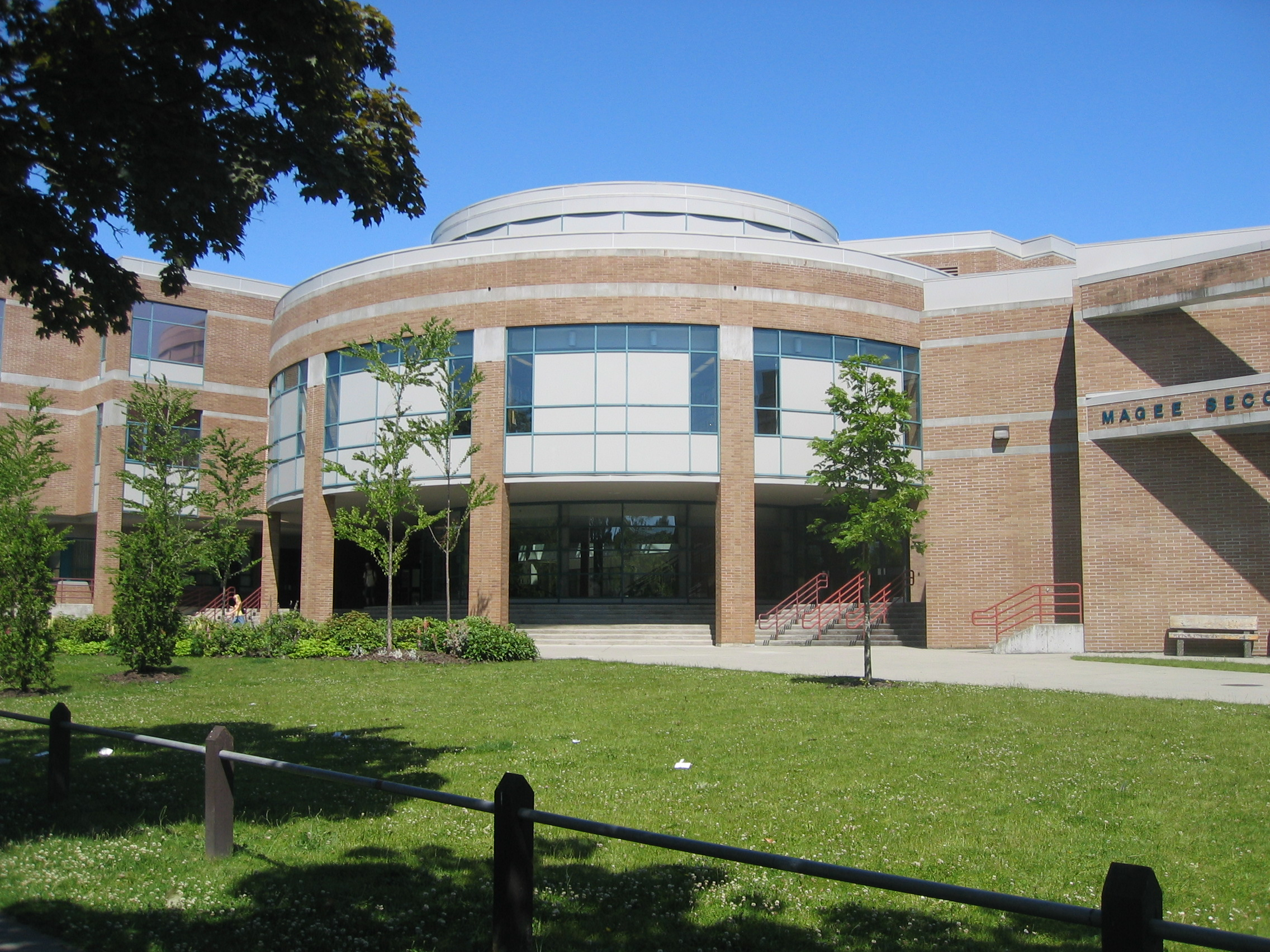

Location
- 6360 Maple Street; Vancouver, British Columbia, V6M 4M2; Canada

Information
- School type: High School
- Motto: "Esse Quam Videri" (To be, rather than to seem to be)
- Founded: 1914
- School board: Vancouver School Board
- Superintendent: Helen McGregor
- Area trustee: Jennifer Reddy
- School number: 03939003
- Principal: Raza Mirani
- Grades: 8-12
- Enrollment: 1,167 (2024/2025)
- Language: English
- Area: Kerrisdale
- Colours: Red and Black
- Mascot: Lion
- Team name: Lions
- Public transit access: R4 41st Avenue RapidBus 16, 41, 49
- Website: www.vsb.bc.ca/schools/magee/Pages/default.aspx

Magee Secondary School is a public secondary school on West 49th Avenue, Vancouver, British Columbia, Canada. It is one of the first public high schools located in the Kerrisdale neighbourhood and is fed by the surrounding elementary schools in its catchment area. They include Maple Grove Elementary School, Dr. R. E. McKechnie Elementary School, and David Lloyd George Elementary School. It was used as a temporary hospital during the Influenza Epidemic in 1918.

== History ==
The school was named after one of the first European settlers of British Columbia, with the school being located in the upstairs of Eburne Superior School at the current location of David Lloyd George; it was relocated in 1913 to its current location. While the original Magee Secondary School was built in 1914, it has since been reconstructed. The new Magee officially opened in the year 2000.

The current student population at Magee is approximately 1170, and it has approximately 100 staff members.

Magee has a fine arts department. More than 500 students are involved in the music department's three faculties: band (4 concert bands and 2 jazz bands), concert choir, Evolution choir, chamber choir, strings, and a recent addition of the Magee Symphony Orchestra. Magee senior music students tour internationally every two years. Recent tours have included Hawaii, Thailand, St. Petersburg, Russia (2007), Japan (2009), Central Europe (2011), Spain (2013), the UK (2015), Cuba (2017), and the Baltic States of Finland, Estonia, and Latvia (2019). Some members of the String Orchestra were invited to play on the recording of International Recording Artist K’Naan's new rendition of "Wavin’ Flag" for the Young Artists for Haiti project produced by rock producer, Bob Ezrin. Many of the graduates of the art department go on to careers in art, with many of them studying internationally.

== Program ==
Magee Secondary School offers a wide range of educational learning opportunities for students. Following the BC high school curriculum, Magee offers compulsory courses, including Math, English, Social Studies, and Science. Choice of languages includes English, Japanese, French, and Spanish.

Additionally, Magee Secondary School offers an educational program which is designed for students competing in high performance athletics or performing in the Arts at a high level. In this program, students attend school for a portion of the day in order to accommodate their training schedules and competitions. Students in the SPARTS program must have a training schedule that exceeds 25 hours per week from Monday to Friday. Furthermore, they are required to maintain a minimum "B" average with no failing grades or unsatisfactory behaviour or work habits. This program is offered students from Grades 8 to 12.

== Library ==
The Magee Secondary School Library is located on the second floor, and run by school librarians, supervising teachers and groups of volunteering students. A computer lab is inside the library where people can read online and take courses.

== Sport Program ==
Magee teams play in the Vancouver Secondary School Athletic Association and Vancouver Sea to Sky Athletic Association, which is part of BC School Sports umbrella. The Magee Athletics Program offers sports based on seasons and genders. In fall, aquatics badminton, cross country field, hockey, rugby, soccer, and volleyball are offered, while in Winter, rugby, soccer, softball, tennis, track and field are on offer. Volleyball occurs across both seasons.

In 2020, the Juvenile Girls (Gr. 9) basketball team won the 2019-20 VSSAA City Champion title.

== Magee and Hollywood ==
Magee Secondary was used as fictional Buffalo, New York Glenn High School in I Love You, Beth Cooper. Magee was also used to film part of Shattered, starring Callum Keith Rennie.

== Notable alumni ==
- Gary Basaraba (1976), actor
- Gil Bellows (1985), actor
- Bernard Braden (1934), actor and comedian
- Frances Chung, principal dancer with the San Francisco Ballet
- Robert Christy (1932), physicist
- Bernie Coulson (1983), actor
- Joey Haywood (2002), professional basketball player
- Fred Hollingsworth, west coast modernist architect
- Thomas Fung, businessman (Fairchild Group)
- Bruce Greenwood (1974), actor
- Alexander Gumuchian (2013), rapper, singer, songwriter, under the name bbno$
- Margot Kidder (1965), actress
- Philip Kim (2015), breakdancer, Olympic gold medalist
- Michelle Lang (1993), only Canadian reporter to die in the War in Afghanistan
- Fredrik Logevall (1981), Pulitzer Prize-winning historian
- Graham Ludlow (1979), actor, screenwriter and producer
- Grant McCracken (1969), anthropologist
- Rebecca Marino, tennis player
- Carrie-Anne Moss (1985), actress
- Grace Park (1992), Hollywood actress
- Josh Ramsay (1998), lead singer of the band Marianas Trench
- Dal Richards, OBC conductor and musician
- Rachel Roberts (1996), actress, model
- Jeremy Ten (2008), figure skater, Canadian Medalist/World Team Member
- Ken Sim, Mayor of Vancouver
- Emmanuelle Vaugier (b. 1976), actress
- Tobi Wong (1993), designer, artist
- Jeanny Yao and Miranda Wang, co-founders of BioCellection
- Richard Zokol, former PGA golfer winner of 1992 Greater Milwaukee Open
