= TED (conference) =

American-Canadian organization of conferences

TED Conferences, LLC
- Company type: LLC
- Website type: Conference
- Available in: English, multilingual subtitles, transcript
- Founded: February 23, 1984; 42 years ago
- Headquarters: New York City, U.S.; Vancouver, British Columbia, Canada
- Area served: Canada; United States
- Owners: Sapling Foundation (1984–2019); TED Foundation (2019–present)
- Founders: Richard Saul Wurman; Harry Marks
- Revenue: ▲US$66.2 million (2015)
- Website: ted.com
- Registration: Optional
- Launched: February 23, 1984; 42 years ago (first conference); February 22, 1990; 36 years ago (first annual event)
- Current status: Active

TED Conferences, LLC (Technology, Entertainment, Design) is an American-Canadian nonprofit media organization that posts international talks online for free distribution under the slogan "Ideas Change Everything" (previously "Ideas Worth Spreading"). It was founded by Richard Saul Wurman and Harry Marks in February 1984 at a technology conference, in which Mickey Schulhof gave a demo of the compact disc that was invented in October 1982. Its main conference has been held annually since 1990. It covers many topics—from science to literature to business to global issues—in more than 100 languages.

TED's early emphasis was on technology and design, consistent with its Silicon Valley origins. It later broadened to include scientific, cultural, political, humanitarian, and academic topics. It has been curated by Chris Anderson, a British-American businessman, through the non-profit TED Foundation since July 2019 (originally by the non-profit Sapling Foundation).

The main TED conference has been held annually in Vancouver, British Columbia, Canada, at the Vancouver Convention Centre since 2014. The first conferences from 1984 (TED1) through 2008 (TED2008) were held at the Monterey Conference Center in Monterey, California. From 2009 to 2014, it was held in Long Beach, California, United States. TED events are also held throughout North America and in Europe, Asia, and Africa, offering live streaming of the talks. TED returned to Monterey in 2021 with TEDMonterey. The talks address a wide range of topics within the research and practice of science and culture, often through storytelling.

TED conferences are invitation-only events with an admission of $6,000.

External videos
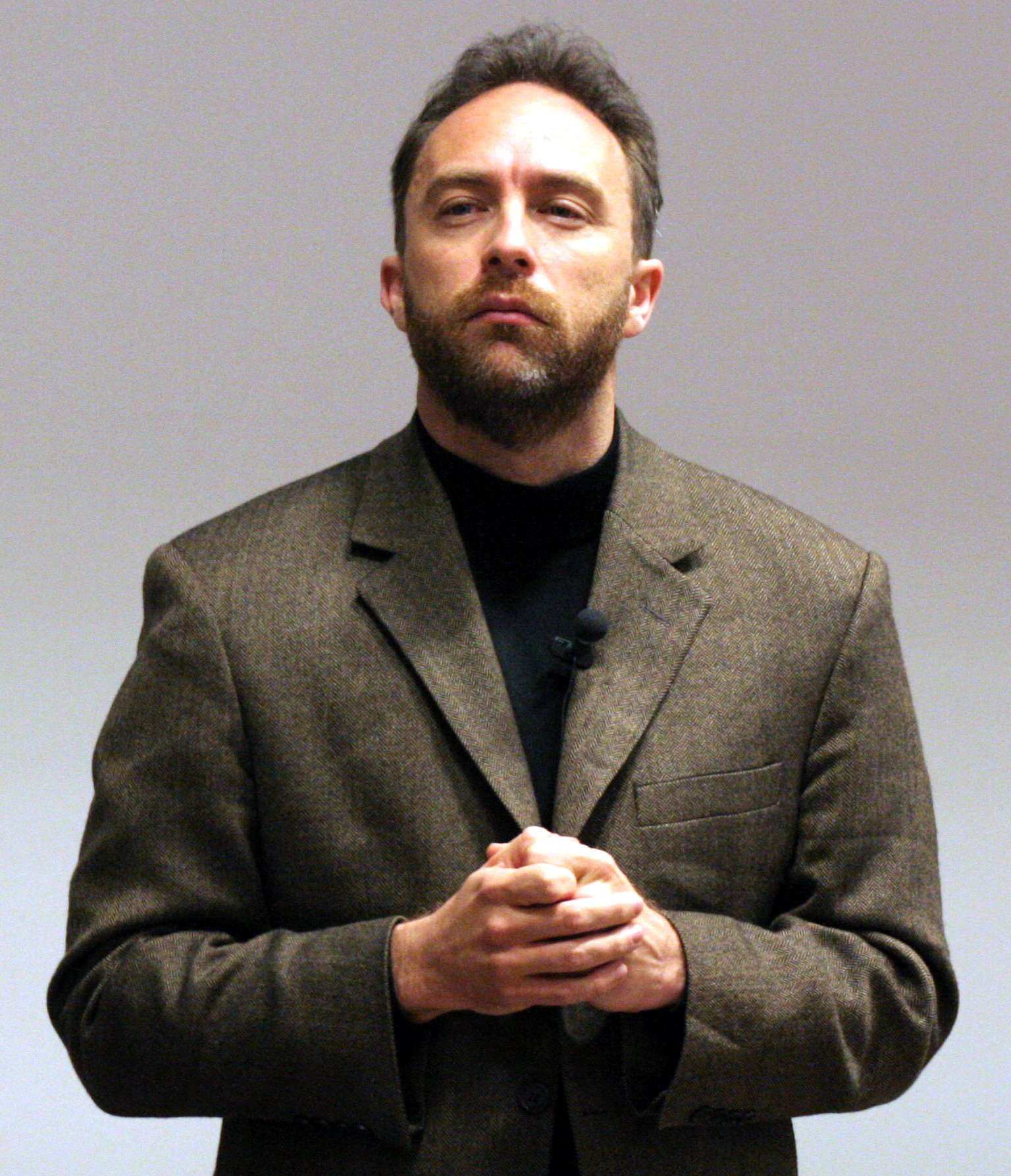
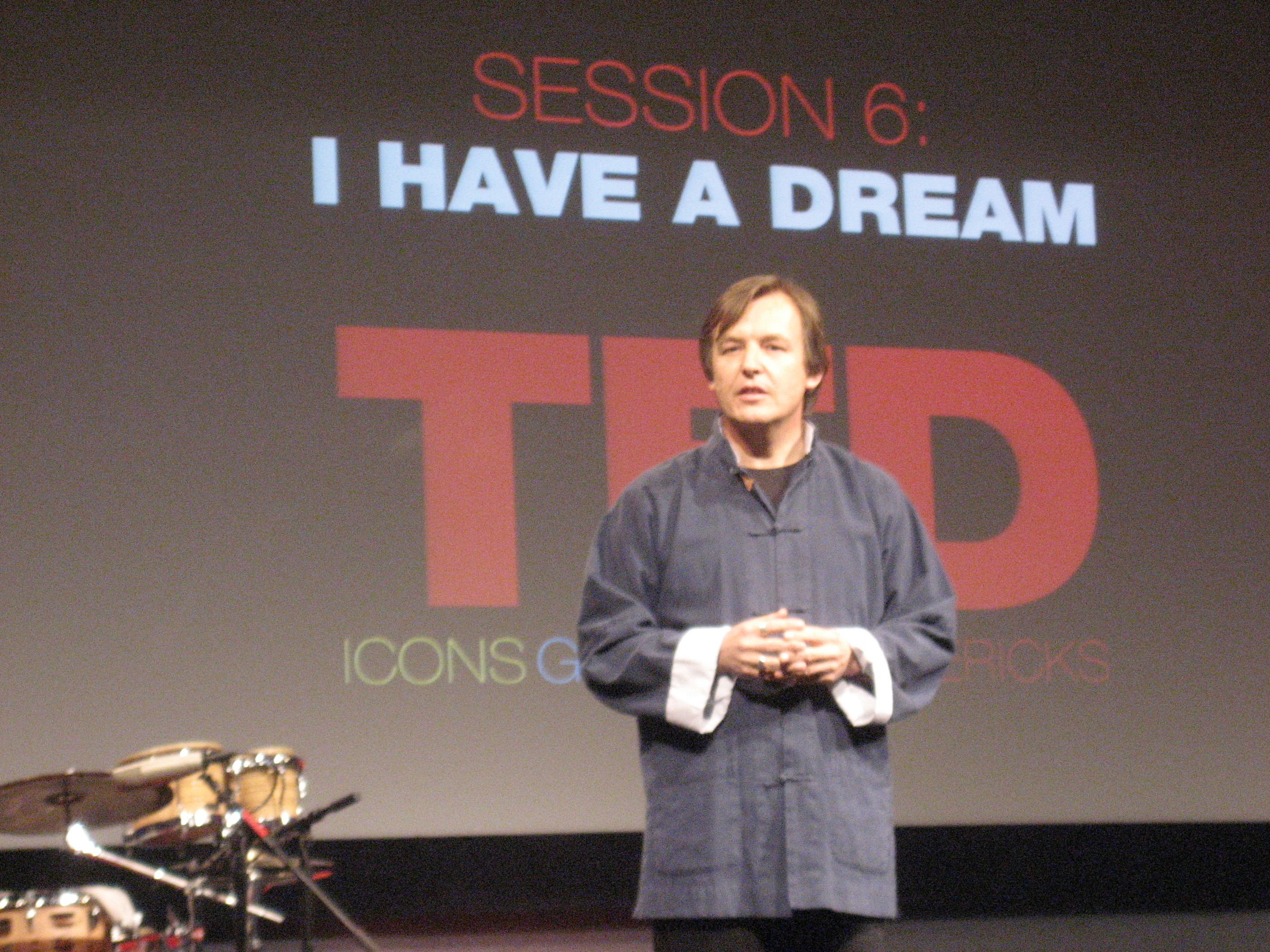
- Jimmy Wales: The birth of Wikipedia, TED 2005
- Chris Anderson: TED's nonprofit transition, TED 2002

Since June 2006, TED Talks had been offered for online streaming. By June 2011, TED Talks' combined viewing figures surpassed 500 million.

== History ==
=== 1984–1999: Founding and early years ===
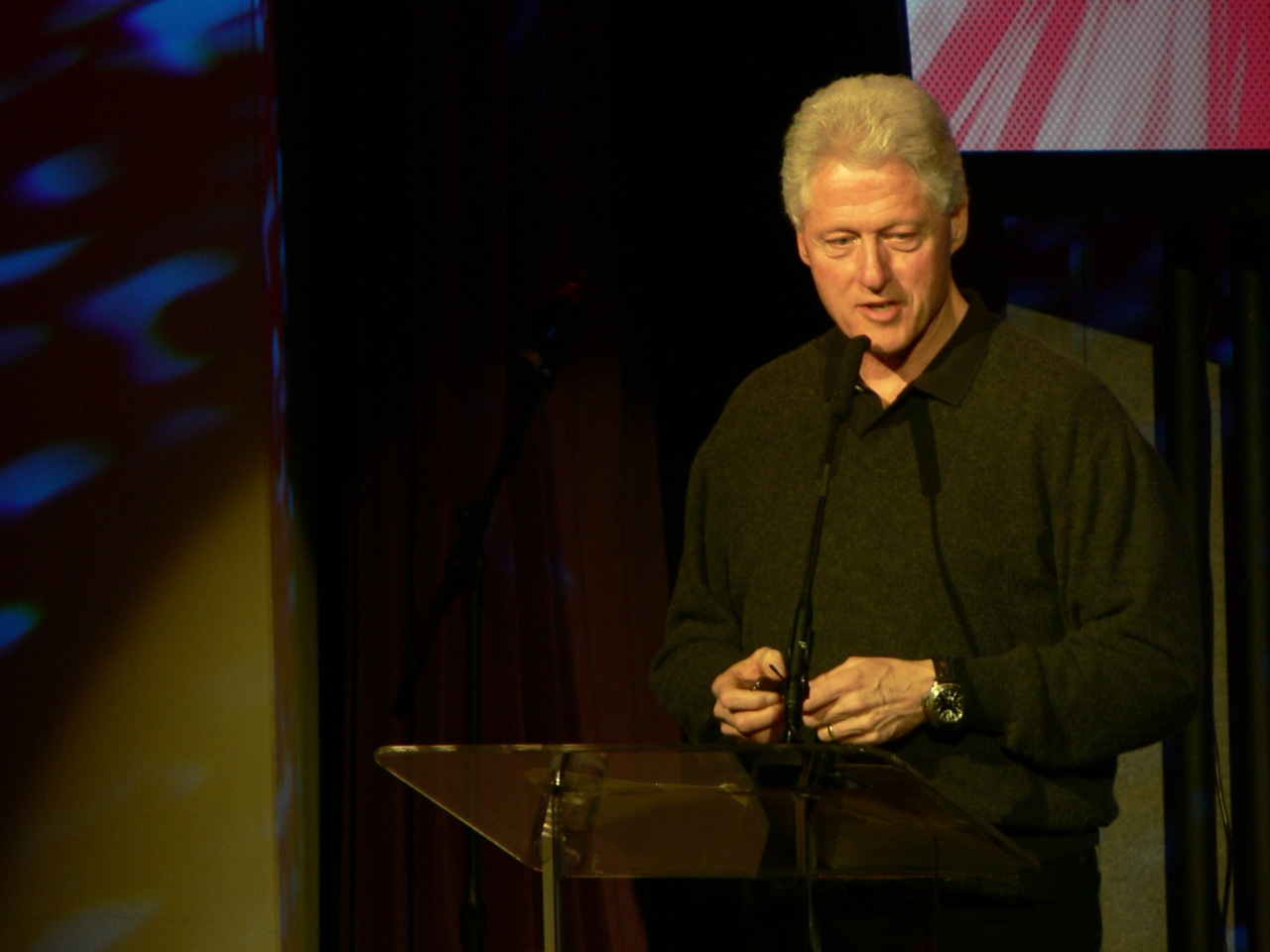
Bill Clinton addresses TED, 2007.

TED was conceived in 1984 by Richard Saul Wurman, FAIA '76, and co-founded by Emmy-winning broadcast and graphic designer Harry Marks and CBS president emeritus Frank Stanton. The conference featured demos of the compact disc, co-developed by Philips and Sony, and one of the first demonstrations of the Apple Macintosh computer. Presentations were given by the mathematician Benoit Mandelbrot and others such as Nicholas Negroponte and Stewart Brand. The event was financially unsuccessful; six years elapsed before a second conference was organized.

TED2 was held at the same Monterey Conference Center in California in 1990. From 1990 onward, a growing community of "TEDsters" gathered annually with Wurman leading the conference in Monterey until 2009, when it was moved to Long Beach, California, due to a substantial increase in the number of those attending. Speakers were initially drawn from the fields of expertise behind the acronym TED; but during the 1990s, presenters broadened to include scientists, philosophers, musicians, religious leaders, philanthropists, and many others.

=== 2000–present: Subsequent growth ===
In 2000, Wurman, looking for a successor at age 65, met with new-media entrepreneur and TED enthusiast Chris Anderson to discuss future happenings. Anderson's UK media company Future bought TED for $14 million ($12 million in cash and $2 million in stocks). In November 2001, Anderson's non-profit the Sapling Foundation (motto: "fostering the spread of great ideas") acquired TED from Future for £6m. In February 2002, Anderson gave a TED Talk in which he explained his vision of the conference and his future role of curator.

In 2012, TED community director Tom Rielly helped the producers of Prometheus gain approval for the use of the TED brand in the promotional short film TED 2023, designed by Rielly with Ridley Scott and Damon Lindelof, directed by Luke Scott, and starring Guy Pearce as Peter Weyland, who in the film speaks at a fictional TED conference at Wembley Stadium in the then-future of 2023; on the film's release, Rielly noted that the association had generated millions of unique visits to the TED website.

In 2014, the conference was moved to Vancouver, British Columbia, Canada.

TED is currently funded by various revenue streams, including attendance fees, corporate sponsorships, foundation support, licensing fees, and book sales. Sponsors do not participate in the event's creation and do not present on the main stage.

In 2015, TED staff consisted of about 180 people headquartered in New York City and Vancouver, British Columbia. On July 1, 2019, the TED Conferences LLC was transferred from Sapling Foundation to TED Foundation to "align with our brand and make it easier for our donors to connect TED donations to TED Conferences, LLC."

In 2021, TED launched the TED Audio Collective with a number of podcasts featuring previous TED Talks and other relevant topics.

TED 2022 was held in Vancouver. There was criticism after Marvin Rees, Mayor of Bristol, flew 9,200 miles (14,800 km) to speak about climate change and the need for reduced carbon emissions.

In 2025, it was announced that the annual conference would move to San Diego, California, beginning in 2027.

== TED Prize ==
The TED Prize was introduced in 2005. Until 2010, $100,000 was given annually to three individuals with a "wish to change the world". Each winner unveiled their wish at the main annual conference. The winners from this period are as follows:

- 2005: Bono, Edward Burtynsky, Robert Fischell
- 2006: Larry Brilliant, Jehane Noujaim, Cameron Sinclair
- 2007: Bill Clinton, Edward O. Wilson, James Nachtwey
- 2008: Dave Eggers, Neil Turok, Karen Armstrong
- 2009: Sylvia Earle, Jill Tarter, José Antonio Abreu

Since 2010, a single winner has been chosen to ensure that TED can maximize its efforts in achieving the winner's wish. In 2012, the prize was not awarded to a person, but to a concept connected to the current global phenomenon of increasing urbanization. In 2013, the prize amount was increased to $1 million. The winners from this period are as follows:

- 2010: Jamie Oliver
- 2011: JR
- 2012: City 2.0
- 2013: Sugata Mitra
- 2014: Charmian Gooch
- 2015: David Isay
- 2016: Sarah Parcak
- 2017: Raj Panjabi

TED Conference commissioned New York artist Tom Shannon to create a prize sculpture for all TED Prize winners. It consists of an eight-inch-diameter (20 cm) aluminum sphere magnetically levitated above a walnut disc. As of 2018, the prize has been recast as The Audacious Project.

== TED.com ==
In 2005, Chris Anderson hired June Cohen as Director of TED Media. In June 2006, after Cohen's idea of a TV show based on TED lectures was rejected by several networks, a selection of talks that had received highest audience ratings was posted on the websites of TED, YouTube and iTunes under Creative Commons Attribution-NonCommercial-NoDerivs 3.0. Only a handful of talks was initially posted to see if there was an audience for them. In January of the following year, the number of talks on the sites had grown to 44, and they had been viewed more than three million times. On the basis of that success, the organization pumped hundreds of thousands of dollars into its video production operations and the development of a website to feature about 100 of the talks.

In April 2007, the new TED.com was launched, developed by New York and San Francisco-based design company Method. The website has won many prizes, including seven Webby Awards, iTunes' "Best Podcast of the Year" (2006–2010); the Communication Arts Interactive Award for Information Design (2007); the OMMA Award for Video Sharing, the Web Visionary Award for Technical Achievement, and The One Show Interactive Bronze Award (2008); the AIGA Annual Design Competition (2009); and a Peabody Award (2012).

In January 2009, TED videos had been viewed 50 million times. In June 2011, they reached 500 million views.

In March 2012, Netflix announced a deal to stream an initial series of 16 two-hour collections of TED Talks on similar subjects. It was made available to subscribers in the United States, Canada, Latin America, the United Kingdom, and Ireland. Hosted by Jami Floyd, TED Talks NYC debuted on NYC Life on March 21, 2012.

== Related projects and events ==
=== TED conferences ===
Date	Conference	Theme	Location	Notable speakers
April 15–19, 2024	TED 2024	The Brave and The Brilliant	Vancouver, British Columbia	Sam Altman, Eric Schmidt, Palmer Luckey, Steven Pinker, Richard Dawkins
April 17–21, 2023	TED 2023	Possibility	Vancouver, British Columbia	
April 10–14, 2022	TED 2022	A New Era	Vancouver, British Columbia	Elon Musk, Garry Kasparov, Al Gore, Alexis Nikole Nelson, Bryce Dallas Howard, Allyson Felix
October 12–15, 2021	TED Countdown Summit		Edinburgh, Scotland	
October 10, 2020	TED Countdown 2020		Online	
May 18, 2020 − July 10, 2020	TED 2020	Uncharted	Online @ TED.com	
July 21–25, 2019	TEDSummit 2019	A Community Beyond Borders	Edinburgh, Scotland	Nicola Sturgeon, Carole Cadwalladr
April 15–19, 2019	TED 2019	Bigger than us	Vancouver, British Columbia	America Ferrera
November 28–30, 2018	TEDWomen 2018	Showing up	Palm Springs, California	Stacey Abrams, Pat Mitchell, Cecille Richards
November 14–16, 2018	TEDMED 2018	Chaos+Clarity	Palm Springs, California	
April 10–14, 2018	TED 2018	The Age of Amazement	Vancouver, British Columbia	
November 1–3, 2017	TEDWomen 2017	Bridges	New Orleans, Louisiana	
August 27–30, 2017	TEDGlobal 2017	Builders. Truth-tellers. Catalysts.	Arusha, Tanzania	
April 24–28, 2017	TED 2017	The Future You	Vancouver, British Columbia	Robert Sapolsky
November 14, 2016	TEDYouth 2016	Made in the Future	Brooklyn Museum, Brooklyn, New York	
October 26–28, 2016	TEDWomen 2016	It's about time.	San Francisco, California	
June 26–30, 2016	TEDSummit 2016	Aim higher. Together.	Banff, Alberta	
February 15–19, 2016	TED 2016	Dream	Vancouver, British Columbia	
November 14, 2015	TEDYouth 2015	Made in the Future	Brooklyn Museum, Brooklyn, New York	
November 1–6, 2015	TED Talks Live	Six nights of talks on Broadway	Town Hall Theatre, New York, New York	
May 27–29, 2015	TEDWomen 2015	Momentum	Monterey, California	
March 16–20, 2015	TED 2015	Truth and Dare	Vancouver, British Columbia	Bill Gates
March 16–20, 2015	TEDActive 2015	Truth and Dare	Whistler, British Columbia	
November 15, 2014	TEDYouth 2014	Worlds Imagined	Brooklyn Museum, Brooklyn, New York	
October 6–10, 2014	TEDGlobal 2014	South!	Rio de Janeiro, Brazil	Alejandro Aravena, Glenn Greenwald, Vik Muniz, Ameenah Gurib-Fakim, Marie Arana, Grimanesa Amorós
March 17–21, 2014	TED 2014	The Next Chapter	Vancouver, British Columbia	
March 17–21, 2014	TEDActive 2014	The Next Chapter	Whistler, British Columbia	
February 25 – March 1, 2013	TED 2013	The Young. The Wise. The Undiscovered.	Long Beach, California	Miranda Wang, Jeanny Yao
February 25 – March 1, 2013	TEDActive 2013	The Young. The Wise. The Undiscovered.	Palm Springs, California	
February 27 – March 2, 2012	TED 2012	Full Spectrum	Long Beach, California	
February 27 – March 2, 2012	TEDActive 2012	Full Spectrum	Palm Springs, California	

=== TEDGlobal ===
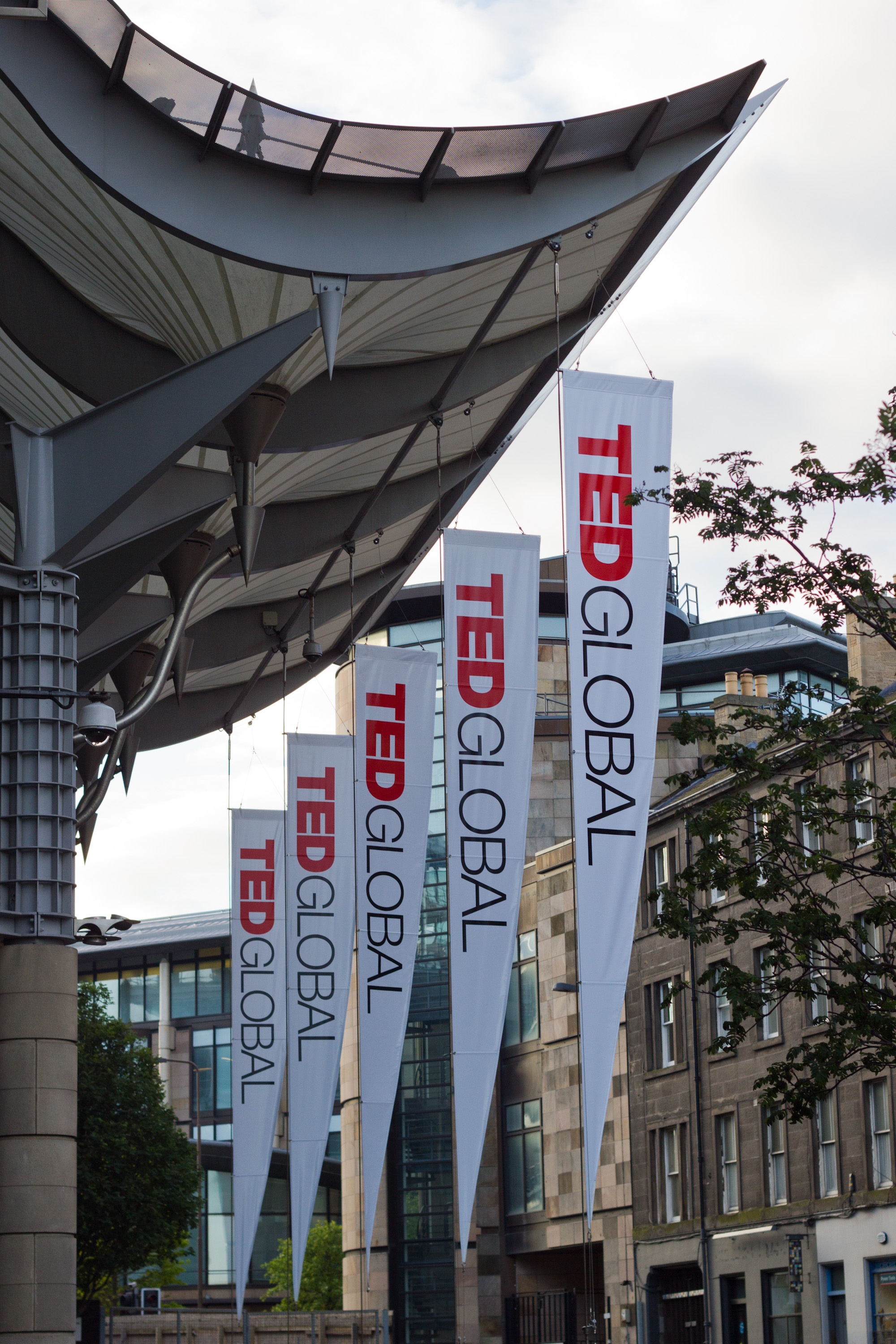
TEDGlobal 2012 at the Edinburgh International Conference Centre

In 2005, under Anderson's supervision, a more internationally oriented sister conference was added, under the name TEDGlobal. It was held, in chronological order: in Oxford, UK (2005), in Arusha, Tanzania (2007, titled TEDAfrica), in Oxford again (2009 and 2010), and in Edinburgh, UK (2011, 2012, and 2013). In 2014, it was held in Rio de Janeiro, Brazil. Additionally, there was TED India, in Mysore (2009) and TEDGlobal London in London (2015). TEDGlobal 2017 was held again in Arusha, Tanzania, and it was curated and hosted by Emeka Okafor.

TED's European director (and curator of TEDGlobal) is Swiss-born Bruno Giussani.

The TED 2011 conference, The Rediscovery of Wonder, was held in Long Beach, California, US, from February 28 to March 4, 2011. The TED conference has a companion conference, TEDGlobal, held in the UK each summer. The 2009 TEDGlobal, The Substance of Things Not Seen, was held in Oxford, July 21–24, 2009. 2010's TEDGlobal (again in Oxford) was themed And Now The Good News; in 2011 the conference moved to a new home in Edinburgh and was held July 12–15 with the theme The Stuff Of Life. The 2012 TEDGlobal conference Radical Openness was held in Edinburgh, June 25–29.

=== TED-Ed ===
TED-Ed is a YouTube channel from TED which creates short animated educational videos. It also has its own website. TED-Ed lessons are created in collaboration with educators and animators. Current advisers for TED-Ed lessons include Aaron Sams, Jackie Bezos, John Hunter, Jonathan Bergmann, Melinda French Gates, and Sal Khan. It has over 23 million subscribers as of October 2026.

=== TEDx ===
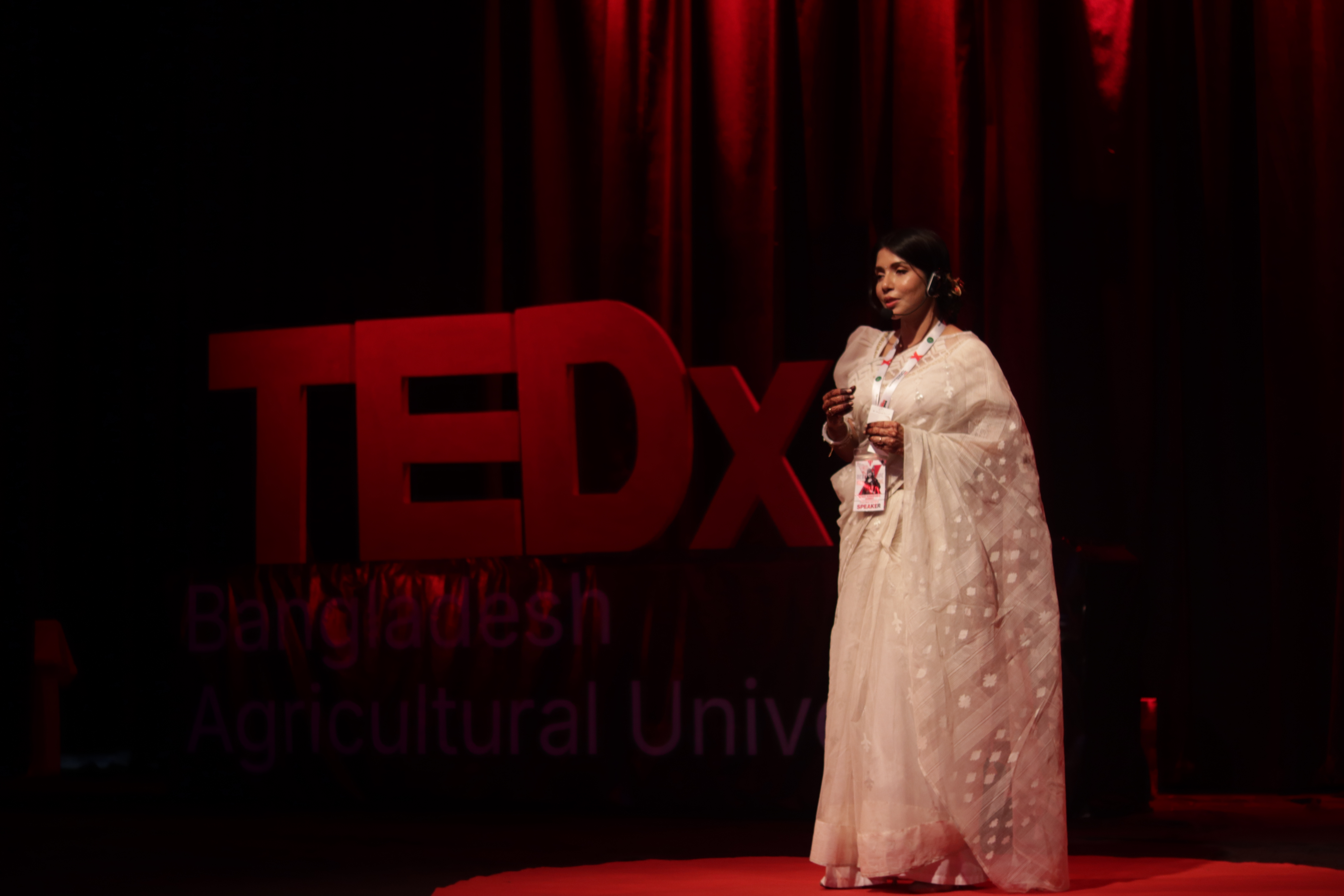
Quazi Nawshaba Ahmed speaking at TEDx Bangladesh Agricultural University

TEDx was founded by Lara Stein. TEDx are independent events similar to TED in presentation. They can be organized by anyone who obtains a free license from TED, and agrees to follow certain principles. Speakers are not paid and must relinquish the copyrights to their materials, which TED may edit and distribute under a non-commercial Creative Commons license (CC-BY-NC-SA).

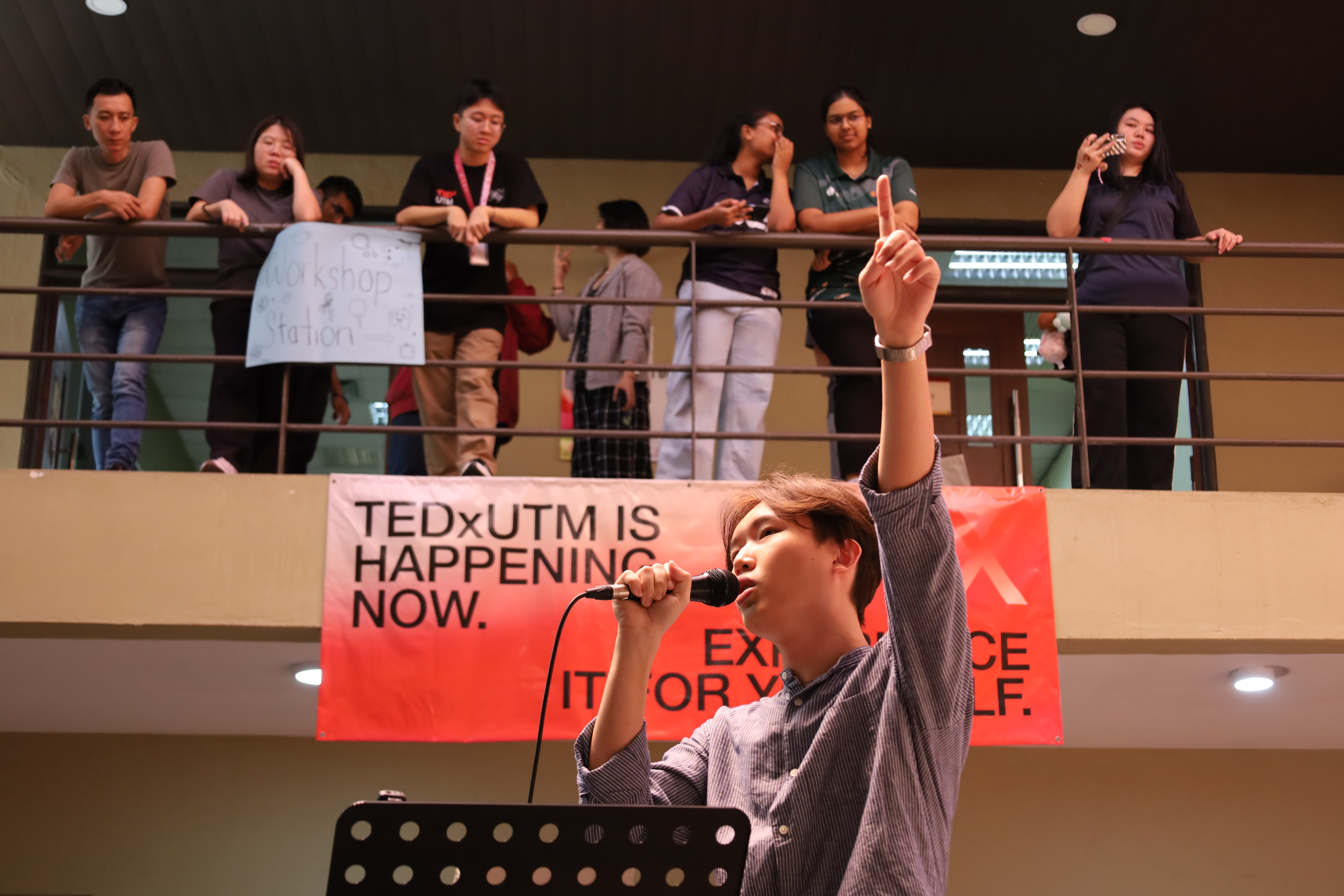
TEDx events are often accompanied by side activities such as workshops and performances, such as this one at TEDxUTM.

By 2012, TEDx events ran at a global rate of about 5 per day, in 133 countries.

=== TEDx Youth ===
TEDxYouth is a programme of independently organised events licensed by TED that focus on engaging young people in sharing ideas and experiences. These events are typically organised by schools, youth groups, or community organisations, and feature speakers—often students or young professionals—alongside educators, artists, and innovators. Like other TEDx events, TEDxYouth conferences operate under free licences granted by TED, but are planned and coordinated locally. The format usually includes short talks, performances, and interactive activities designed to inspire creativity, critical thinking, and community involvement among younger audiences.

Country	TEDxYouth events
Ireland	TEDxYouth@Dún Laoghaire in Dún Laoghaire, County Dublin, Ireland
Vietnam	TEDxYouth@AIS Vietnam, in Ho Chi Minh City
India	TEDxYouth@VSA Youth in Bangalore
Kyrgyzstan	TEDxYouthBishkek, organized in Bishkek, Kyrgyzstan
Thailand	TEDxYouth@ChiangMai in Chiang Mai
Qatar	TEDxYouth@Doha in Doha Kiwix

=== TED Fellows ===
TED Fellows were introduced in 2007, during the first TEDAfrica conference in Arusha, Tanzania, where 100 young people were selected from across the continent. Two years later, during TEDIndia, ninety-nine fellows were recruited, mainly from South Asia.

In 2009, the fellows program was initiated in its present form. For every TED or TEDGlobal conference, 20 fellows are selected; a total of 40 new fellows a year. Each year, 20 past fellows are chosen to participate in the two-year senior fellows program (in which they will attend four more conferences).

2019 marked the tenth anniversary of the TED Fellows program.

Acceptance as a fellow is not based on academic credentials, but mainly on past and current actions, and plans for the future. Besides attending a conference free of charge, each fellow takes part in a special program with mentoring by experts in the field of spreading ideas, and can give a short talk on the "TED Fellows" stage. Some of these talks are subsequently published on TED.com. Senior fellows have additional benefits and responsibilities.

=== TED Audio Collective ===
The TED Audio Collective is a collection of podcasts with more than 25 shows.

One of those shows is the TED Interview podcast that launched on October 16, 2018, during which Chris Anderson holds conversations with speakers who have previously given a TED talk, providing the guest a chance to speak in greater depth about their background, projects, motivation, re-evaluation of past experiences, or plans for the future.

Season 1
No. in season	Title	Airdate
Intro	Chris Anderson	September 25, 2018
1	Elizabeth Gilbert shows up for ... everything	October 2018
2	David Deutsch on the infinite reach of knowledge	October 2018
3	Sam Harris on using reason to build our morality	October 2018
4	Dalia Mogahed on Islam in the world today	November 2018
5	Steven Pinker on the case for optimism	November 2018
6	Robin Steinberg's quest to reform cash bail	November 2018
7	Mellody Hobson challenges us to be color brave	November 2018
8	Ray Kurzweil on what the future holds next	December 2018
9	Daniel Kahneman wants you to doubt yourself. Here's why	December 2018
10	Sir Ken Robinson still wants an education revolution	December 2018
Bonus	Chris Anderson on the Ezra Klein Show	December 20, 2018

Season 2
No. in season	Title	Airdate
Extra	Roger McNamee takes on big tech	May 3, 2019
1	Bill Gates looks to the future	May 2019
2	Amanda Palmer on radical truth telling	May 2019
3	David Brooks on political healing	May 2019
4	Kai-Fu Lee on the future of AI	June 2019
5	Susan Cain takes us into the mind of the introvert	June 2019
6	Andrew McAfee on the future of our economy	June 2019
7	Sylvia Earle makes the case for our oceans	June 2019
8	Monica Lewinsky argues for a bully-free world	July 2019
9	Tim Ferriss on life-hacks and psychedelics	July 2019
10	Yuval Noah Harari reveals the real dangers ahead	July 2019
11	Johann Hari challenges the way we think about depression	July 2019

Season 3
No. in season	Title	Airdate
Bonus	Parag Khanna: On global connectivity	September 25, 2019
1	Dan Gilbert on the surprising science of happiness	October 2019
2	Anil Seth explores the mystery of consciousness	October 2019
3	Elif Shafak on the urgent power of storytelling	October 2019
4	Michael Tubbs on politics as a force for good	October 2019
5	Kate Raworth argues that rethinking economics can save our planet	November 2019
6	Donald Hoffman has a radical new theory on how we experience reality	November 2019
7	Frances Frei's three pillars of leadership	November 2019
8	Christiana Figueres on how we can solve the climate crisis	December 2019
Bonus	Tom Rivett-Carnac is optimistic about the fate of our planet	December 23, 2019

Season 4
No. in season	Title	Airdate
Bonus	Adam Kucharski on what should—and shouldn't—worry us about the coronavirus	Recorded on March 11, 2020; broadcast on March 12, 2020
1	Bill Gates on how we must respond to the COVID-19 pandemic	Recorded on March 24, 2020; broadcast on March 30, 2020
2	Seth Berkley on the quest for the coronavirus vaccine	Recorded on March 26, 2020; broadcast on March 31, 2020
3	Jonathan Sacks on how we can navigate the coronavirus pandemic with courage and hope	Recorded on March 30, 2020; broadcast on March 31, 2020
4	Gary Liu on what the world can learn from China's response to COVID-19	Recorded on March 25, 2020; broadcast on April 1, 2020
5	Sonia Shah: How to make pandemics optional, not inevitable	Recorded on March 31, 2020; broadcast on April 2, 2020
6	Matt Walker: How to sleep during a pandemic	Recorded on April 1, 2020; broadcast on April 2, 2020
7	Elizabeth Gilbert says it's OK to feel overwhelmed. Here's what to do next	Recorded on April 2, 2020; broadcast on April 3, 2020
8	Susan David: Emotional resilience in times of crisis	Recorded on March 23, 2020; broadcast on April 4, 2020
9	Priya B. Parker: How to create meaningful connections while apart	Recorded on March 27, 2020; broadcast on April 5, 2020
10	Danielle Allen: The tech we need to end the pandemic and restart the economy	Recorded on April 6, 2020; broadcast on April 7, 2020
11	Ray Dalio: What coronavirus means for the global economy	Recorded on April 9, 2020; broadcast on April 10, 2020
12	Fareed Zakaria: The world after the coronavirus pandemic	Recorded on April 9, 2020; broadcast on April 10, 2020
13	Elizabeth Dunn: Design your life for happiness	Recorded on February 5, 2020; broadcast on April 17, 2020
14	Dambisa Moyo: What we get wrong about global growth	Recorded on March 5, 2020; broadcast on April 24, 2020
15	Kristalina Georgieva: What we learn from the crisis can make our economy stronger	Recorded on May 18, 2020; broadcast on May 28, 2020
16	Phillip Atiba Goff, Rashad Robinson, Bernice King, Anthony D. Romero: The path to ending systemic racism in the US	Recorded on June 3, 2020; broadcast on June 6, 2020
17	Audrey Tang: How Taiwan used digital tools to solve the pandemic	Recorded on June 1, 2020; broadcast on June 11, 2020
18	Dan Schulman: Why a company's future depends on putting its employees first	Recorded on May 19, 2020; broadcast on June 18, 2020
19	Ashraf Ghani: A path to peace in Afghanistan	Recorded on June 16, 2020; broadcast on June 25, 2020
20	Al Gore: On the new urgency of the climate crisis	Recorded on June 23, 2020; broadcast on July 2, 2020
21	Darren Walker: The role of the wealthy in achieving equality	Recorded on July 1, 2020; broadcast on July 9, 2020
22	Malala Yousafzai: On why educating girls changes everything	Recorded on July 8, 2020; broadcast on July 16, 2020

=== TEDMED ===
TEDMED is an annual conference concerned with health and medicine. It is an independent event operating under license from the nonprofit TED conference.

In 2011, Jay Walker and a group of executives and investors purchased TEDMED from Hodosh for $16 million with future additional payments of as much as $9 million. The conference was then moved to Washington, DC.

=== Other programs ===
- TED Radio Hour: A radio program, with audio downloads and a podcast RSS feed, hosted by Manoush Zomorodi, previously Guy Raz, and co-produced with NPR. Each episode uses multiple TED Talks to examine a common theme. Originated and executive produced by Deron Triff and June Cohen, the first episode was broadcast in 2012.
- TED also offers other podcasts such as Sincerely, X (featuring anonymous TED Talks).

== Criticism ==
=== Pricing ===
Sarah Lacy of BusinessWeek and TechCrunch wrote in 2010 that TED attendees complained of elitism from a "hierarchy of parties throughout the LA area with strict lists and security" after the sessions. She gave credit for freely live-streaming and posting videos of its talks.

=== TED Talk content ===
Disagreements have occurred between TED speakers and organizers. In her 2010 TED Talk, comedian Sarah Silverman referred to adopting a "retarded" child. TED organizer Chris Anderson objected via his Twitter account, leading to a conflict between them conducted over Twitter.

Also in 2010, statistician Nassim Taleb called TED a "monstrosity that turns scientists and thinkers into low-level entertainers, like circus performers". He claimed TED curators did not initially post his talk "warning about the financial crisis" on their site on purely cosmetic grounds.

In May 2012, venture capitalist Nick Hanauer spoke at TED University, challenging the belief that top income earners in America were the engines of job creation. TED attracted controversy when it chose not to post Hanauer's talk on their website. His talk analysed the top rate of tax versus unemployment and economic equality. TED was accused of censoring the talk by not posting it.

On May 7, 2012, TED curator Chris Anderson, in an email to Hanauer, commented on his decision and took issue with several of Hanauer's assertions in the talk, including the idea that businesspeople were not job creators. He also made clear his aversion to the talk's "political nature".

The National Journal reported that Anderson considered Hanauer's talk one of the most politically controversial they had produced, and they needed to be careful about when they posted it. Anderson responded on his personal blog that TED posted only one talk each day, selected from many. Forbes staff writer Bruce Upbin noted that Hanauer's claim of a relationship between tax rates and unemployment was based entirely on falsified unemployment data, while New York magazine condemned TED's move.

TEDx talks have been criticised for having a lower quality control than actual TED talks, with a number of TEDx talks being ridiculed by critics for promoting pseudoscience. Wired and the Harvard Business Review suggested that this lack of quality control in TEDx talks damaged the broader TED brand.

Following a TEDx talk by parapsychologist Rupert Sheldrake, TED issued a statement saying their scientific advisors believed that "there is little evidence for some of Sheldrake's more radical claims", and recommended that it "should not be distributed without being framed with caution". The video was moved from the TEDx YouTube channel to the TED blog, accompanied by such framing language. This prompted accusations of censorship, which TED rebutted by pointing out that Sheldrake's talk was still on their website. A 2013 talk by Graham Hancock, promoting the use of the drug DMT, was treated the same way.

According to Professor Benjamin Bratton at University of California, San Diego, TED Talks' efforts at fostering progress in socio-economics, science, philosophy and technology have been ineffective. Chris Anderson responded that some critics misunderstood TED's goals, failing to recognise that it aimed to instill excitement in audiences in the same ways speakers felt it. He said that TED wished only to bring awareness of significant topics to larger audiences.

== In popular culture ==
The Alien franchise features a fictional portrayal of a 2023 TED Conference, in the form of a short film called "The Peter Weyland Files: TED Conference, 2023". It was a part of the viral marketing campaign for the franchise's film Prometheus (2012).

Episode 08, season 20 of the animated TV series Family Guy features a cutaway scene of Peter Griffin giving a TED talk about birthdays.

Australian alternative rock band TISM parodied TED talks at their 2 March 2024 concert in Launceston, Tasmania, as "TISM Talks", which included a skit parodying TED talks running behind the band for the duration of the show.

Episode 16 of series 2 of the TV series Elementary, "The One Percent Solution", features ex-Scotland Yard Inspector Gareth Lestrade presenting a "DUG Chat". According to a tweet from the @ELEMENTARYstaff Twitter account, "We had to call them 'Dug' chats because we weren't allowed to use the name 'Ted Talk'".

The popular image of TED Talks as featuring speakers who present topics that are eccentric, idiosyncratic or rarefied has been parodied in the form of a phrasal Internet meme, typically conveyed on social media with the comment "thanks for coming to my TED Talk" after the poster themselves or another user articulates a bemusing or oddly specific stance on something.

== See also ==
- List of educational video websites
- Change.org
- Chautauqua
