= Richard Saul Wurman =

American architect (born 1935)

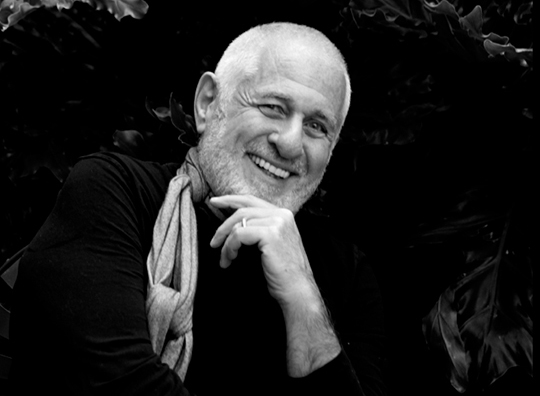
- Born: March 26, 1935 (age 91); Philadelphia, Pennsylvania, U.S.
- Education: University of Pennsylvania (BArch, MArch)
- Occupations: Architecture, information architecture, design
- Known for: 19.20.21; TEDMED; WWW Conference; 555 Conference
- Website: www.wurman.com

Richard Saul Wurman (born March 26, 1935) is an American architect, author, information and graphic designer. Wurman has written, designed, and published over 90 books and created the TED conferences and TEDMED, conferences on health and medicine. Wurman received the Lifetime Achievement award from Cooper Hewitt and the AIGA Gold Medal for his work in information design.

In his book Information Anxiety (1989), Wurman developed the LATCH principles, or "Five Hat Racks", offering a framework for organizing information. LATCH, an acronym, stands for Location, Alphabet, Time, Category, and Hierarchy. These principles provide a finite set of ways to structure information, regardless of the subject matter, making it easier to understand and navigate.

== Early life and education ==
Wurman was born in Philadelphia on March 26, 1935. He received both his B.Arch. and M.Arch. degrees from the University of Pennsylvania, completing his graduate degree with honors in 1959.

== Career ==
After graduating, Wurman practiced architecture for 13 years including working for Louis Kahn in 1960–1961, Charles and Ray Eames, and independently.

In 1962, he took a teaching position at North Carolina State University's School of Design.

Wurman chaired the IDCA Conference in 1972, the First Federal Design assembly in 1973, and the annual American Institute of Architects (AIA) conference in 1976.

Wurman is the founder of TED conferences which later became TED Talks. He created and chaired the TED conferences from their creation in 1984 through 2002, TEDMED from 1995 through 2010, the EG conference, and the WWW conference. He sold the rights to TED in 2001 to the Sapling Foundation for a reported $14 million.

He works with Esri and RadicalMedia on comparative cartographic initiatives for mapping urban settings, which is planned to culminate in the creation of a network of live urban observatories around the world.

Wurman supports SENS Research Foundation, a nonprofit biotechnology organization that seeks to repair the damages of aging and extend healthy lifespan. He taught at University of Cambridge, North Carolina State University and Princeton.

== Publications ==
Wurman has written, designed, and published nearly a hundred books on varying topics, including Notebooks and Drawings of Louis I. Kahn (1963) and What Will Be Has Always Been (1986), a collection of words by Louis Kahn. Wurman met Kahn during his studies at UPenn.

Wurman's map-oriented and infographic guidebooks include the Access travel series (starting with Access/LA in 1980), several books on healthcare including Understanding Healthcare (2004), Understanding USA (1999), Information Anxiety (1989) and its second edition, Information Anxiety 2 (2000).

Wurman is credited with inventing the term "information architecture". His books about information architecture and information design include Information Architects (1996) and UnderstandingUnderstanding (2017).

== Awards ==
Wurman was awarded the Arthur Spayed Brooks Gold Medal, several honorary doctorates, a Graham fellowship, a Guggenheim fellowship, numerous federal National Endowment for the Arts grants, and has served as a distinguished professor at Northeastern University. He is a recipient of the 2019 National Design Award in Lifetime Achievement category from Cooper Hewitt, Smithsonian Design Museum, an Annual Gold Medal from Trinity College, Dublin, 2004 Gold Medal from AIGA, and Boston Science Museum's 50th Annual Bradford Washburn Award in 2014. He is also an American Institute of Architects fellow and member of the Art Directors Club of New York Hall of Fame.

== Personal life ==
Wurman lives on Bellevue Avenue in Newport, Rhode Island, and in Golden Beach, Florida, after having previously lived in Manhattan in New York City. He's been married to novelist Gloria Nagy since 1980. They have four children and six grandchildren. Wurman is Jewish.
