= Aaron Sams =

American educator

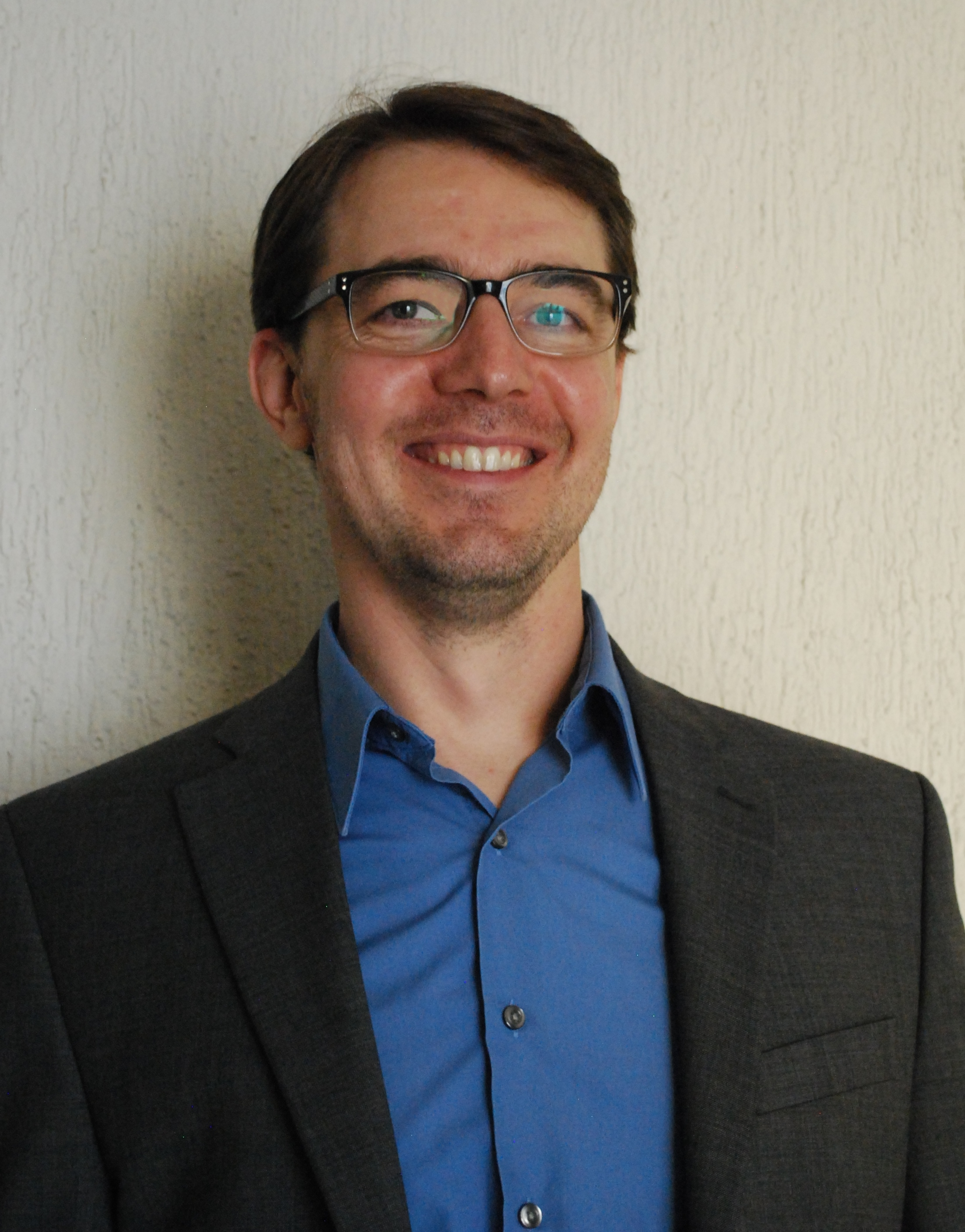
- Education: Biola University
- Website: personal website and blog

Aaron Sams is one of the developers of the flipped classroom model for education, which seeks to shift lecture from classroom onto video so that teachers can dedicate class time to more interactive activities and extra help. Sams developed the idea with fellow chemistry teacher Jonathan Bergmann at Woodland Park High School, at first to help students who fell behind and later to completely change the structure of their classes. The popularity of the online videos with both students and those outside their classes has led Sams to speak at conferences and train teachers in the method. He was also awarded the 2009 Presidential Award for Excellence in Mathematics and Science Teaching for his work.

== Biography ==
Sams earned his bachelor's degree in biochemistry and a master's degree in education from Biola University. He began teaching in 2000, first at Los Altos High School in Hacienda Heights, California, and then at Woodland Park High School in Woodland Park, Colorado. It was in Colorado where Sams met Bergmann and began to develop the flipped classroom model.

Since Woodland Park, Sams served as co-chard of the Colorado State Science Standards Revision Committee, then moved on to become the director of digital learning at the Reformed Presbyterian Theological Seminary in Pittsburgh.

Currently, he is the founder of Sams Learning Designs, LLC, Turn About Learning LLC and The Flipped Learning Network. He is also an adjunct at Saint Vincent College in Latrobe, PA, and serves as an advisor to TED-Ed.

== Flipped learning ==
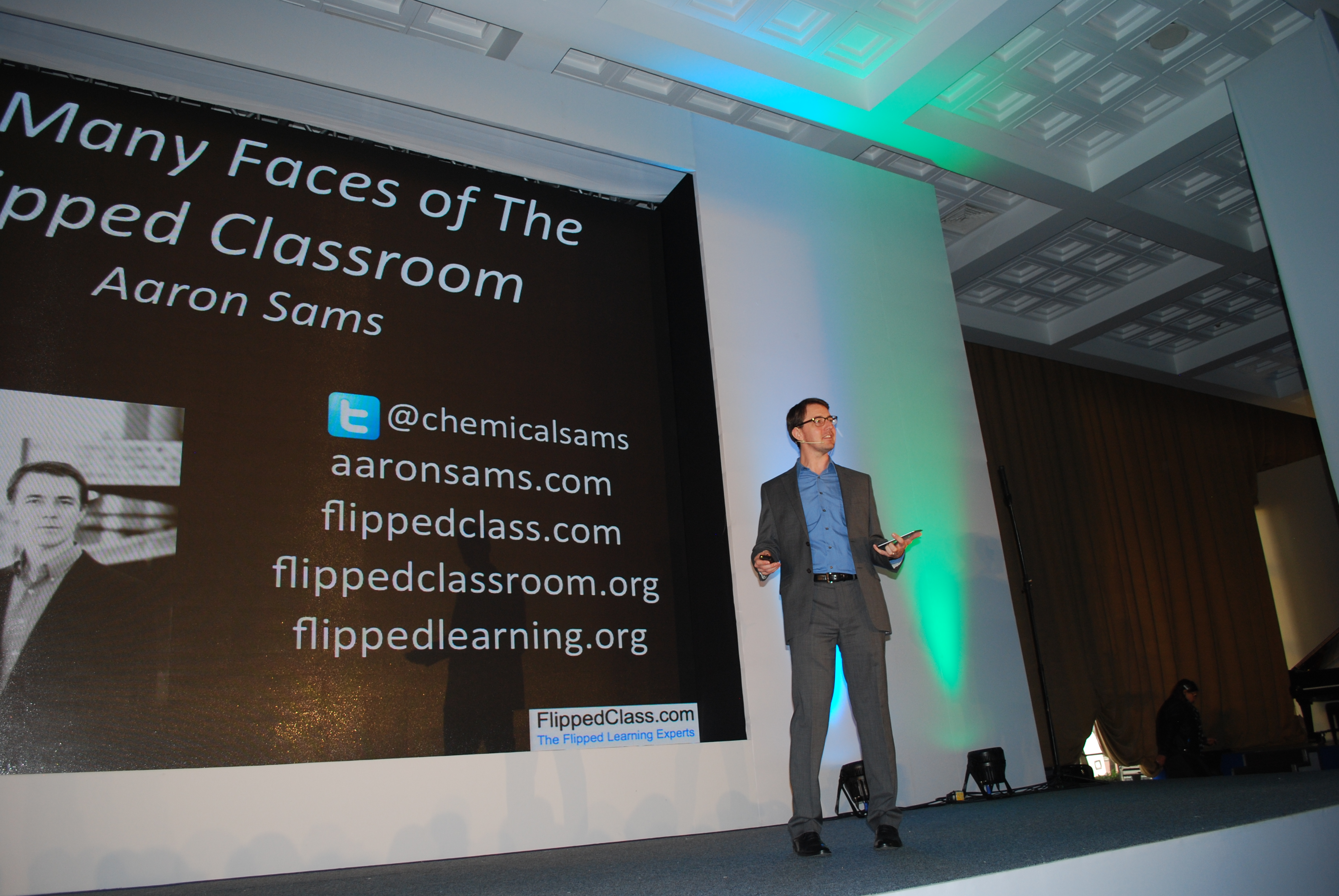
Sams presenting at the 1er Congreso Internacional de Educación Innovativa at the Tec de Monterrey, Mexico City

Sams is the co-developer of the flipped classroom model of education, which seeks to move class lecture out of the classroom onto video, so that class time can be dedicated to more interactive activities. Sams and Bergmann met at Woodland Park High School in 2006, at the school's chemistry department. They shared similar teaching philosophies and began collaborating, at first to share workloads.

Aaron found an article in a technology magazine about software to record a PowerPoint, voice it, and more to create a video to distribute online. At the time, online video was still new, but the two thought of it as a good idea to help students who miss class and or need review, especially those who spend much time bussing to and from school. They began to record their live classes with screen capture software and posted the lectures online, where students could see it on a computer to download it onto their iPods. At first, it allowed them to direct students to videos instead of reteaching material in class. Soon they found that even students who had attended class reviewed the videos, including before exams.

It was Sams’ idea to record all lecture and dedicate classroom time to questions, exercises and active lab work, which is the center of the notion of flipped classroom, and the two teachers did so for the 2007–2008 school year for all their chemistry and AP Chemistry classes. Class time became committed to working with students in areas of difficulty and active lab exercises.

Sams and Bergmann also began receiving emails from people outside the class who were watching them, which led to online networking with other math and chemistry teachers in the U.S. His first presentation on the model was from the Cañon City, Colorado school system, which was soon followed an interview on a local television station.

Since then, he has spoken at conferences and trained teachers at schools, districts, and universities in various parts of the United States, Canada, and Europe. Sams does not take credit for the term “flipped classroom,” stating along with Bergman that the term arose in the media.

Sams believes strongly in inquiry and in student-centered learning environments, in which students are encouraged to learn and demonstrate their understanding in ways that are meaningful to them. For Sams, the flipped classroom needs to have four elements: flexibility to allow students to choose when and where they learn, a learning culture where students actively participate, focus on taking maximum advantage of class time, and an education who constantly observes and provides feedback. According to Sams, “Students can take these anywhere, even on a bus to a soccer game. They can get their chemistry lesson and they essentially have a pause button for their teacher. They can pause, write down questions and come prepared.” It also allows the student to move at their own pace and not letting them move on until they demonstrate mastery of the current concepts.

He has worked with other teachers interested in flipping their classrooms, especially in foreign language, leading training workshops on creating video lessons and other aspects of the method. He frequently speaks and conducts workshops on educational uses of screencasts and the flipped classroom concept.

== Recognition ==
Sams received the Presidential Award for Excellence in Mathematics and Science Teaching, the highest recognition for K-12 teachers in the United States.

== Publications ==
- Flipped Learning: Gateway to Student Engagement (2014)
- Flip Your Classroom: Reach Every Student in Every Class Every Day (2012)
