= Jonathan Bergmann =

American chemistry teacher

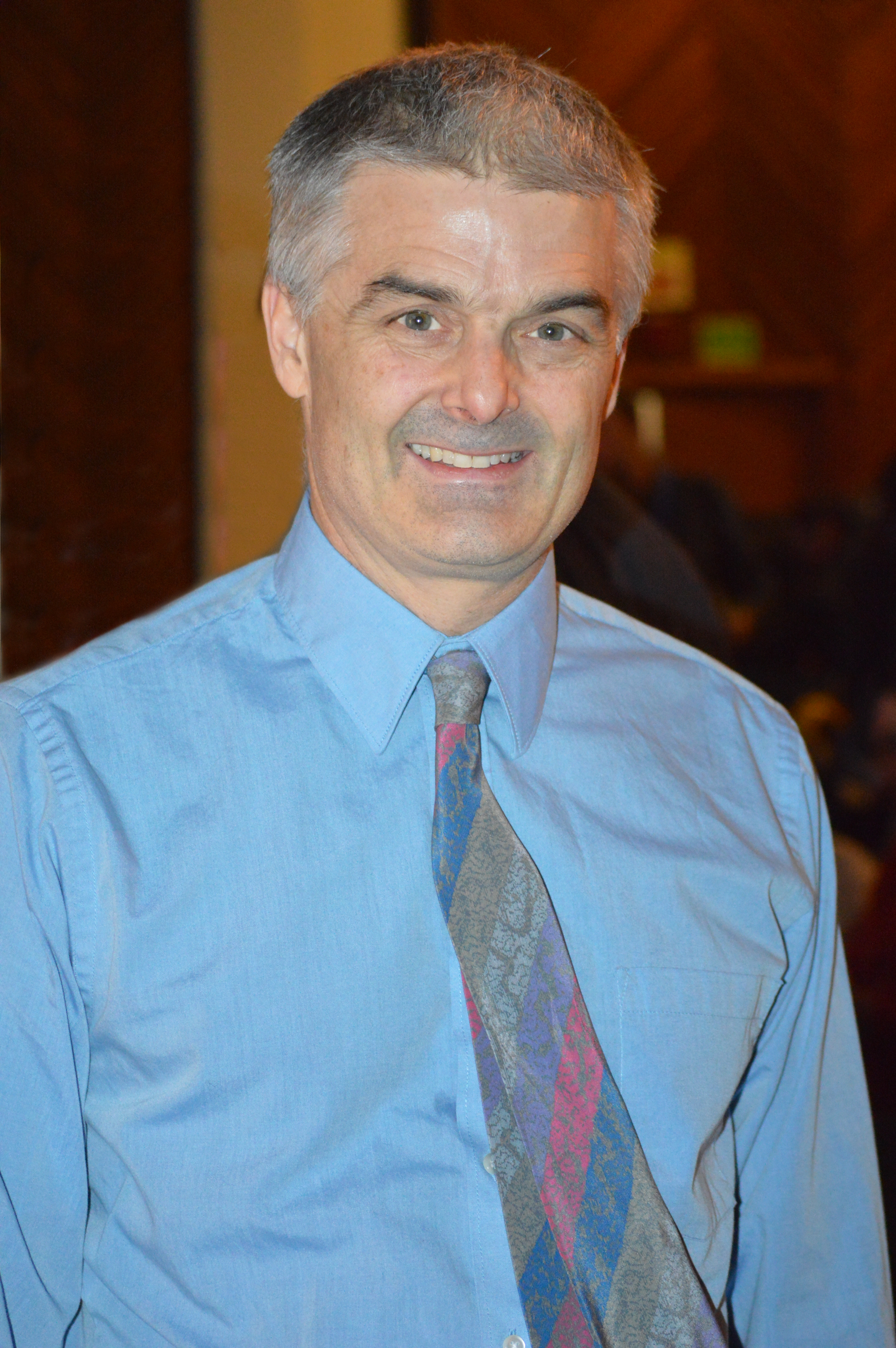
- Bergmann at the 8o Congreso de Innovación y Tecnología Educativa at Monterrey Institute of Technology and Higher Education, Monterrey
- Education: University of Colorado Denver, Oregon State University
- Occupations: Teacher, author, speaker
- Writing career
- Notable work: Flip your classroom: reach every student in every class every day
- Website: www.jonbergmann.com

Jon (Jonathan) Bergmann is an American chemistry and physics teacher and one of the developers of the "flipped classroom" model of teaching along with fellow chemistry teacher Aaron Sams. Although already noted for his teaching, Bergmann decided to "flip" what students did in his classes, watching video lectures at home and doing exercises (homework) in class under supervision. He and Sams not only found that grades went up, they also found time for other types of activities, which Bergmann states is more important than the videos. Bergmann has since become the lead technology facilitator for a school in Illinois and has worked to promote the models speaking at schools, universities, and more both in the United States and abroad. He currently teaches science at a private high school in the suburbs on the West side of Houston, Texas.

== Personal life ==
Jon Bergmann graduated from both the University of Oregon State and the University of Colorado Denver School of Education and Human Development in 1991 with his masters in Educational Technology.

"Jon and his wife make their home in Houston Texas and have three grown children."

== Career ==
Bergmann has worked in education since 1986, spending twenty-four years as a middle and high school science teacher. He first taught for three years at Baker Middle School, then a year at Englewood High School before moving on to Eaglecrest High School, south of Denver, Colorado, where he taught for fifteen years. This was then followed by a position at Woodland Park High School teaching with traditional methods for four years. Then, along with fellow chemistry teacher Aaron Sams, he experimented with putting lectures on video for students to view outside of class. He then became the lead technology facilitator for the Joseph Sears School in Kenilworth, Illinois. Bergmann served as the Chief Academic Officer at the Flipped Learning Global Initiative until 2021 and now teaches high school science at a private institution in Houston Texas.

He also serves on the advisory board for TED-Education.

== Flipped classroom ==
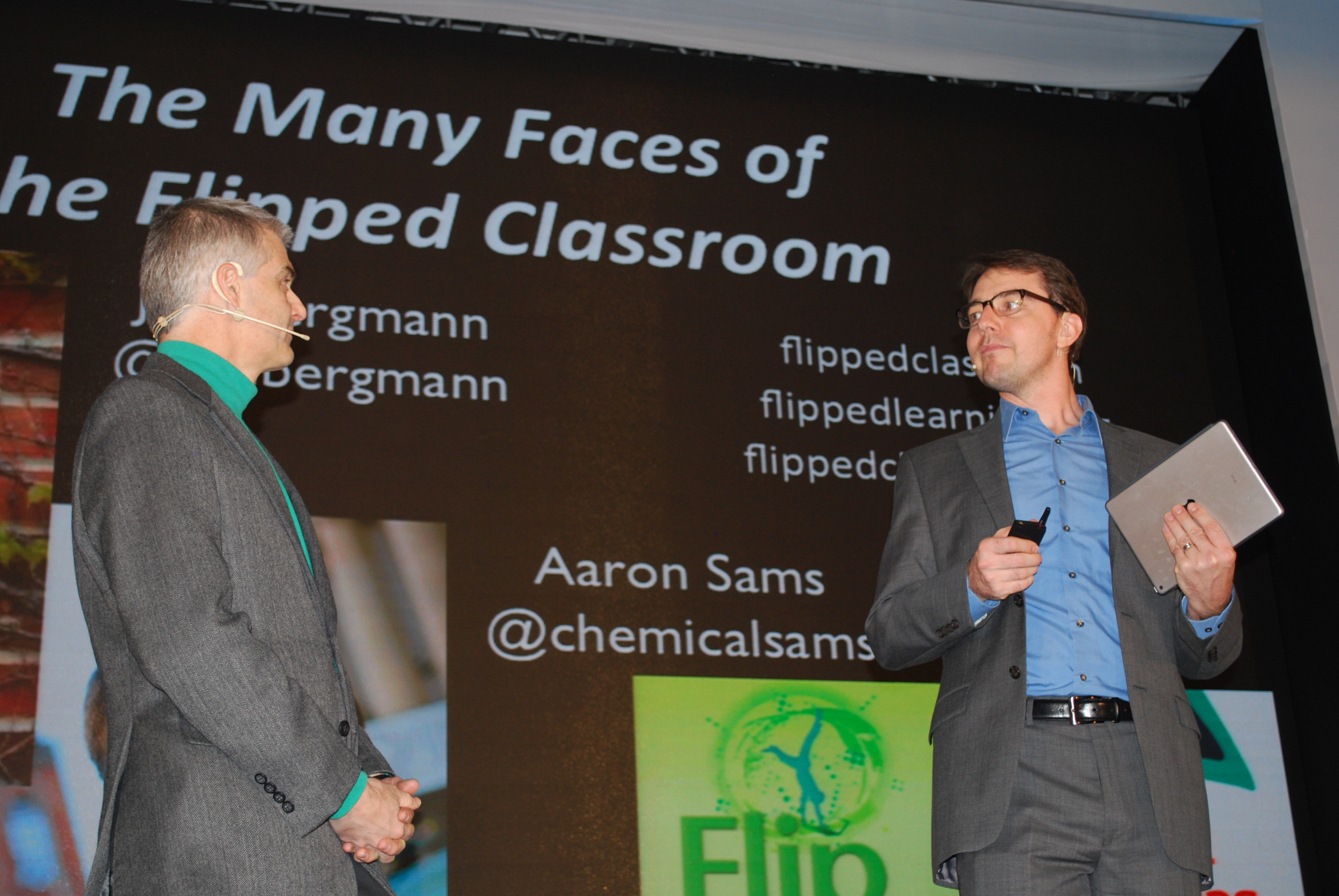
Bergmann and Sams at the Congreso Internacional de Innovación Educativa at the Tec de Monterrey, Mexico City Campus

Bergmann did not invent flipped learning. However, he is noted as a developer of the flipped class movement. Along with fellow chemistry teacher Aaron Sams, he began experimenting with recording content lectures. The idea was to have students watch the videos at home and work on exercises and projects in the classroom under supervision, "flipping" the homework to school and the lecture to home. Bergmann found that with this model, his students' test scores went up.

At first the pair focused on video creation, making them for every lesson. However, they soon discovered what was more important were the activities that students were doing in the classroom, since they no longer spent so much time listening to explanation. Bergmann insists that this is the key to the flipped classroom, not the videos themselves. He believes the guiding question for the flipped classroom movement is What is best for the students in my classroom?

During an interview with Ed Tech magazine he told this anecdote. I remember Annabelle, who came into my class her freshman year and appeared to just want to get by. School did not seem to be a priority for her, and I remember saying to myself, "Annabelle is not going to like this class." I said this because the Flipped-Mastery course really expects all students to deeply learn and not just try and get by. As the year started, Annabelle was frustrated because she constantly took shortcuts to learning.

When she got to the summative assessments, she struggled to pass. Around January or February, I started to notice some remarkable improvement in her learning. She was not struggling with her summative assessments and was getting excited about learning. During one of my daily visits, I chatted with Annabelle and asked her what was going on. Her first comment was, "Mr. Bergmann, I have found it easier if I learn it right the first time." What she was essentially telling me was that she was taking charge of her learning and that she was learning how to learn. She may forget the content of the course, but learning how to learn was a valuable tool she took away from my class that year.

Despite his success with the method, Bergmann still finds challenges with implementing it. It is still difficult to persuade teachers, parents and administrators, less so with students, as they are used to video and the Internet. Grading remains a challenge to the flipped classroom because the method works best if students learn at their own pace, but there are still grading periods.

However, Bergmann and Sams continued promoting the ideas, founding a nonprofit network for those interested. By January 2012, the number of active members on the Flipped Learning Network site had grown from 2,500 to over 28,000. The two wrote the book Flip Your Classroom: Reach Every Student in Every Class Every Day, Flipped Learning: Gateway to Student Engagement, "Flipped Learning for Science Instruction", "Flipped Learning for Social Science Instruction", "Flipped Learning for Math Instruction", "Flipped Learning for English Instruction", and "Flipped Learning for Elementary Instruction". Bergmann has also authored or co-authored numerous articles for various educational publications.

Bergmann has also since become a noted speaker, and has keynoted conferences such as BETT 2013, the Fall CUE 2012, Wisconsin Academic Forum, Numerous Flipped Learning Network Events, FlipCon 1–8, Learning Technologies MENA (Dubai) and the Congress of Innovation and Educational Technology at the Monterrey Institute of Technology and Higher Education. He has also presented at the University of Nebraska at Kearney, University of Texas Brownsville, pre-service teachers at the University of Wisconsin Whitewater, Illinois State University, FlipCon Spain 2016–2018, FlipCon Australia 2015–2018, ICER 2017, Learning and the Brain 2017, and many more.

== Recognition ==
Even before the flipped classroom, Bergman's work was recognized with the Presidential Award for Excellence in Math and Science Teaching, which earned him a trip to the White House to meet the First Lady.

The flipped classroom model has been covered in various publications such as The New York Times and The Washington Post. He and Sams were nominated for the Brock International Prize in Education, and were named one of Tech & Learning's 10 Most Influential of 2013. He was also a semifinalist for Colorado Teacher of the Year in 2010.

== Publications ==
=== Books ===
- Bergmann, J (2023) The Mastery Learning Handbook: A Competency Based Approach to Student Achievement, ASCD, Alexandria VA
- Bergmann, J (2017) Aprender al revés: Flipped Learning 3.0 y metodologías activas en el aula, Ediciones Paidós, Madrid, Spain
- Bergmann, J. & Smith, E. (2017) Flipped Learning 3.0: The Operating System for the Future of Talent Development, FLGlobal, Chicago IL
- Bergmann, J (2017) Solving the Problem of Homework by Flipping the Learning, ASCD, Alexandria VA
- Bergmann, J., & Sams, A. (2016). Flipped Learning for Elementary Instruction, ISTE, Eugene, OR
- Bergmann, J., & Sams, A. (2016). Flipped Learning for English Language Instruction, ISTE, Eugene, OR
- Bergmann, J., & Sams, A. (2015). Flipped Learning for Social Studies Instruction, ISTE, Eugene, OR
- Bergmann, J., & Sams, A. (2015). Flipped Learning for Math Instruction, ISTE, Eugene, OR
- Bergmann, J., & Sams, A. (2015). Flipped Learning for Science Instruction, ISTE, Eugene, OR
- Bergmann, J., & Sams, A. (2014). Flipped Learning: Gateway to Student Engagement, ISTE
- Bergmann, J., & Sams, A. (2012). Flip your classroom: reach every student in every class every day. Eugene, OR.; Alexandria, VA.: ISTE; ASCD.

To see the complete works of Mr. Bergmann, go to the World Catalog Site

=== Selected articles ===
- Bergmann, J (2022) MASTERY LEARNING FLIPPED, Educational Leadership, ASCD*
- Bergmann, J (2022) STUDENTS NEED EMOTIONAL SUPPORT: TRY MASTERY LEARNING, Intrepid Education*
- Bergmann, J (2021) EXTREME DIFFERENTIATION THAT DOESN'T DRIVE YOU CRAZY, Intrepid Education
- Bergmann, J (2021) RETHINK CLASS TIME — NEVER LECTURE IN CLASS AGAIN, Intrepid Education
- Bergmann, J (2021) HOW CAN MASTERY RIVAL TUTORING AND CLOSE EDUCATIONAL GAPS CAUSED BY THE PANDEMIC?, Intrepid Education
- Bergmann, J (2018) Supercharge Your Flipped Class with these Five Strategies, Flipped Learning Review
- Bergmann, J (2018) Don't Even Think About Doing this on the First Day of School, Flipped Learning Review
- Bergmann, J (2018) Creating Homework that Doesn't Suck, District Administration
- Bergmann, J., & Sams, A (2014) Flipped Learning-Maximizing Face Time, Training & Development
- Bergmann, J., & Sams, A (2014) Flipping For Mastery, Educational Leadership, 71(4), 24-29
- Sams, A., & Bergmann, J. (2013). Flip Your Students' Learning. Educational Leadership, 70(6), 16–20.
- Bergmann, J., & Sams, A. (2012). Before you flip, consider this. Phi Delta Kappan, 94(2), 25.
- Bergmann, J., & Sams, A. (2008). Remixing Chemistry Class. Learning & Leading With Technology, 36(4), 22–27.
- Bergmann, J (2013, November 18), The Biggest Hurdle to Flipping Your Class, Edutopia.
- Bergmann, J (2013, August 13), The Perfect Match: Flipped Learning & the Common Core, Pearson & Innovation Network.
- Bergmann, J., & Sams, A. (2012, June 12). Why Flipped Classrooms Are Here to Stay. Education Week - Teacher.
- Bergmann, J., Overmyer, J., & Wilie, B. (2012, April 14). The Flipped Class: Myths vs. Reality (1 of 3). The Daily Riff- Be Smarter. About Education.
