= Sapling Foundation =

American non-profit organization

- Formation: 1996; 30 years ago
- Founder: Chris Anderson
- Type: Non-profit
- Headquarters: New York City, U.S.
- Region served: Worldwide

The Sapling Foundation is a non-profit organization that owned the TED global conference, from 1996 to June 2019. It was founded by Chris Anderson in 1996.

== Overview ==
The organization describes its purpose as follows:

The goal of the foundation is to foster the spread of great ideas. It aims to provide a platform for the world's smartest thinkers, greatest visionaries and most-inspiring teachers, so that millions of people can gain a better understanding of the biggest issues faced by the world, and a desire to help create a better future.

In 2015, Anderson served as president, without compensation, and Thomas Valentino served as CFO and Secretary. The Sapling Foundation's 2015 revenue was about $66 million, of which about $23 million was contributions and about $42 million was TED conference revenue.

On July 1, 2019, the TED Conferences LLC was transferred from Sapling Foundation to TED Foundation to "align with our brand and make it easier for our donors to connect TED donations to TED Conferences, LLC."
