= Lara Aknin =

Canadian social psychologist

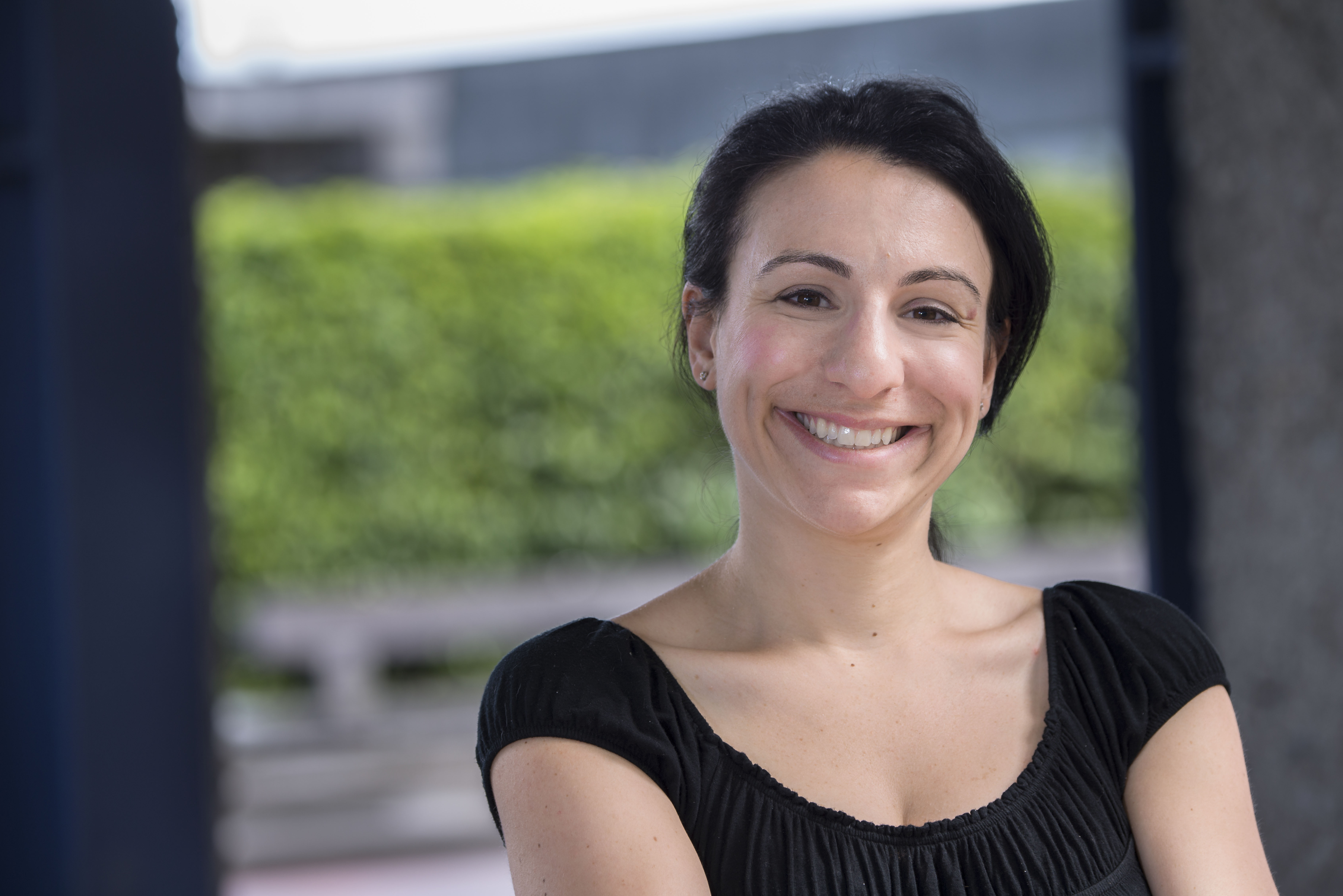
- Lara Aknin in 2014

Academic background
- Education: BA., MA., PhD, University of British Columbia
- Doctoral advisor: Elizabeth Dunn

Academic work
- Discipline: Social Psychology
- Institutions: Simon Fraser University

Lara Beth Aknin is a Canadian social psychologist and Distinguished Professor in the Department of Psychology at Simon Fraser University (SFU). Her research focuses on prosocial behaviour, happiness, and well-being, with an emphasis on examining the predictors and consequences of generosity and prosocial behaviour. She is an editor of the annual World Happiness Report, a former Fellow of the Canadian Institute for Advanced Research, and a former Chair of the Mental Health Task Force of The Lancet COVID-19 Commission.

== Education ==
Aknin completed her Bachelor of Arts in Psychology at the University of British Columbia in 2005, followed by a Master of Arts in 2008 and a PhD in Social Psychology in 2012. She was supervised by Dr. Elizabeth Dunn.

During her graduate studies, Aknin and her collaborators examined whether spending money on others, known as prosocial spending, leads to greater happiness than spending money on oneself. They found that prosocial spending was associated with greater happiness (Dunn et al., 2008). This research was some of the first to demonstrate that helping others promotes greater well-being.

Aknin and her colleagues subsequently expanded this research to children, investigating whether the emotional benefits of prosocial behaviour are present early in development. They found evidence that young children experienced greater happiness when giving to others than when receiving the same resource themselves. This study provided early evidence that the positive emotions associated with giving may help promote prosocial behaviour and cooperation (Aknin et al., 2012).

== Career ==
Aknin joined the Department of Psychology at Simon Fraser University as a faculty member in 2012. Her research examines the predictors and consequences of prosocial behaviour, including when and why helping and generosity are associated with benefits for the person providing help. Her studies have drawn upon multiple populations (e.g. adults, toddlers, ex-offenders) and methods (e.g. surveys, lab and field experiments, facial coding).

In 2013, Aknin and her colleagues examined the relationship between prosocial spending and well-being across 136 countries, using data from over 230,000 participants. They found that prosocial spending was associated with higher life satisfaction across countries with different levels of economic development. They subsequently conducted experiments in Canada, Uganda, India, and South Africa to examine the relationship between prosocial spending and well-being across different cultural and economic contexts (Aknin et al., 2013).

In 2019, Aknin and colleagues investigated the emotional consequences of prosocial spending among at-risk youth and ex-offenders. Across four experiments, they found evidence that the immediate emotional benefits of prosocial spending were detectable even among participants with criminal histories and antisocial inclinations (Aknin et al., 2019).

In response to concerns about the replicability of psychological research, Aknin has incorporated ‘best practices’ into her research, including preregistration, the use of large sample sizes, and the open sharing of research materials and data. Aknin and her colleagues published the first-ever pre-registered replication of the two most widely used prosocial spending paradigms in the Journal of Personality and Social Psychology (Aknin et al., 2020). This work demonstrated the principles of open science for other researchers and provided a robust effect size estimate for the emotional rewards of prosocial spending.

== Teaching ==
Aknin is a deeply committed teacher. At Simon Fraser University, she has taught courses including Introduction to Social Psychology and The Science of Happiness. She consistently receives high student evaluations, revises her courses to include new content and pedagogical techniques (eg., two-stage exams), and has worked with SFU’s Centre for Educational Excellence to develop an anonymous peer evaluation tool to empower students in sharing their experiences.

== Professional Service ==
In response to the COVID-19 pandemic, Aknin chaired the Mental Health Task Force of The Lancet COVID-19 Commission, an international group that examined the mental health and well-being consequences of the pandemic and developed evidence-based recommendations for addressing them. As a Commissioner, she also contributed to several joint statements calling for urgent action on the pandemic response.

Aknin is an Editor of the annual World Happiness Report, which examines international differences in subjective well-being and factors associated with happiness, including social relationships, prosocial behaviour, and economic and social conditions. She first contributed to the report in 2019, and joined the editorial board in 2021.

== Select Awards and Honours ==
- 2015 - President’s New Researcher Award - Canadian Psychological Association
- 2015 Rising Star Award - Association for Psychological Science
- 2016 - Cormack Teaching Award, Simon Fraser University
- 2017 - Ruut Veenhoven Award
- 2019 - Distinguished Professor, Simon Fraser University
- 2020 SAGE Young Scholar Award - Society for Personality and Social Psychology
- 2021 - Barry Beyerstein Award for Excellence in Teaching, Simon Fraser University
- 2022 - Emerging Thought Leaders Newsmaker Award, Simon Fraser University
- 2023 Fellow of the Society for Personality and Social Psychology
- 2024 - FASS Dean’s Medal, Simon Fraser University

== Selected Publications ==
- Aknin, L. B.; Barrington-Leigh, C.P.; Dunn, E.W.; Helliwell, J.F.; Burns, J.; Biswas-Diener, R.; Kemeza, I.; Nyende, P.; Ashton-James, C.E.; Norton, M.I. (2013). "Prosocial spending and well-being: Cross-cultural evidence for a psychological universal". Journal of Personality and Social Psychology. 104 (4): 635–652. doi:10.1037/a0031578.
- Aknin, L.B.; Dunn, E.W.; Proulx, J.; Lok, I. (2020). "Does spending money on others promote happiness? A registered replication report". Journal of Personality and Social Psychology. 119 (2): e15-326. doi:10.1037/pspa0000191.
- Aknin, L.B.; Hamlin, J.K.; Dunn, E.W. (2012). "Giving leads to happiness in young children". PLoS ONE. 7 (6): e39211. doi:10.1371/journal.pone.0039211.
- Dunn, E.W.; Aknin, L.B.; Norton, M.I. (2008). "Spending money on others promotes happiness". Science. 319 (5870): 1687–1688. doi:10.1126/science.1150952.
- Hanniball, K.B.; Aknin, L.B.; Douglas, K.S.; Viljoen, J.L. (2019). "Does helping promote well-being in at-risk youth and ex-offender samples?". Journal of Experimental Social Psychology. 82: 307–317. doi:10.1016/j.jesp.2018.11.001.
