= Miranda Wang =

Canadian tech entrepreneur (born 1994)

- Born: 1994 (age 31–32)
- Education: Magee Secondary School
- Alma mater: University of Pennsylvania (BA)
- Occupation: Tech entrepreneur
- Known for: Co-founder of Novoloop
- Awards: Young Champions of the Earth

Miranda Wang (born 1994) is a Canadian entrepreneur and environmental innovator, best known as the co‑founder and CEO of Novoloop (formerly BioCellection, Inc.), a company that develops chemical recycling technologies to transform previously unrecyclable plastic waste into high‑value materials. Her work focuses on tackling global plastic pollution, creating sustainable recycling solutions, and moving toward a circular economy for plastics.

== Early life and education ==
Miranda Wang was born in 1994 and raised in Vancouver, British Columbia, Canada. Her interest in environmental sustainability began as a teenager during a field trip to the Vancouver South Waste Transfer Station, where she witnessed the vast amount of plastic waste destined for landfills. This experience motivated her to seek innovative ways to prevent plastics from entering waste streams. While attending Magee Secondary School, Wang met Jeanny Yao through the school recycling club. In 2012, they entered the Sanofi BioGENEius Canada competition, researching plastic‑degrading bacteria with mentorship from university scientists. Though the biological approach was later deemed impractical at scale, it initiated their long‑term pursuit of solutions to plastic waste.

Wang earned a Bachelor of Arts in molecular biology with minors in philosophy and engineering entrepreneurship from the University of Pennsylvania in 2016. While in college, she and Yao continued to refine their business model and technology, participating in entrepreneurship competitions and incubator programs.

== Career and Innovation ==
In 2015, Wang and Yao founded BioCellection in Menlo Park, California, which later became Novoloop. The company focused on developing chemical recycling technologies capable of breaking down types of polyethylene — especially low‑density (LDPE) and high‑density (HDPE) plastics — that traditional mechanical recycling systems struggle to process.

Novoloop’s proprietary process uses chemical methods to break polyethylene chains into basic “monomers,” which are then rebuilt into valuable materials such as thermoplastic polyurethane (TPU), a performance plastic used for consumer goods like shoes, automotive parts, and electronics. This approach aims to reduce reliance on fossil fuels and significantly lower greenhouse gas emissions compared to producing virgin plastic materials.

The company has advanced its technology to industrial pilot scale. In 2024, Novoloop completed continuous operations at its demonstration plant in Surat, India, processing post‑consumer plastics into high‑quality materials and providing a model for future commercial plants. The process reportedly produces up to 91% fewer carbon emissions than conventional plastics production and is a key step toward scaling a circular plastics economy.

Novoloop has also raised substantial funding to support growth and commercialization. The company closed an $11 million Series A round in 2022, with additional investment that extended the round to approximately $21–24 million through contributions from global venture partners, chemical firms, and sustainability‑focused investors aimed at scaling the technology.

== Novoloop ==
Upon graduation, Wang has continued to build Novoloop. The company continues to work towards a scalable way to create a sustainable cycle for plastics. The company has developed a multistep process that transforms low density and high density polyethylene (LDPE and HDPE), which is commonly used in disposable packaging, into new and sustainable materials. The company's first material is a thermoplastic polyurethane (TPU), which has comparable performance to many commercial rubbers. In addition to saving the recycled plastic from landfills, the company's process also produces much less greenhouse gas emissions than the production of other materials. Novoloop decided to focus on innovating ways of recycling polyethylene (PE) plastics because it noticed a lack of technologies on the market that clean these “dirty plastics”. Having developed an economical way of recycling polyethylene (PE) plastics, Novoloop is working to build a fully commercial processing plant. Wang hopes that this plant would be able to recycle tens of thousands of tonnes of plastic a year. To help the company scale, Novoloop has partnered with the cities of San José, along with GreenWaste Recovery.

In February 2022, Novoloop raised $11 million in Series A funding to support the scaling of its recycling technology and build a larger processing facility.

== Awards and recognition ==
Wang’s work has received broad recognition. In 2018, she was awarded the Pritzker Emerging Environmental Genius Award for developing a method to transform otherwise unrecyclable plastic into useful chemicals and materials, backed by a $100,000 prize that helped advance research and development^{89}.

In 2018–2019, Wang was also named a Young Champion of the Earth by the United Nations Environment Programme, and in 2019 she received a Rolex Award for Enterprise, honoring her innovative contributions to sustainable plastic solutions and enabling her to build early pilot infrastructure. Forbes included Wang and her co‑founder in its 30 Under 30 list of social entrepreneurs, highlighting their impact on global sustainability efforts.

Novoloop’s technology has implications beyond recycling; it demonstrates a pathway toward intercepting millions of tonnes of plastic waste annually and replacing traditional fossil‑derived materials with recycled, high‑performance alternatives. Wang’s efforts have helped shift the narrative on plastics from waste management to material innovation and circular design.
