= Chris Anderson (entrepreneur) =

British-American businessman (born 1957)

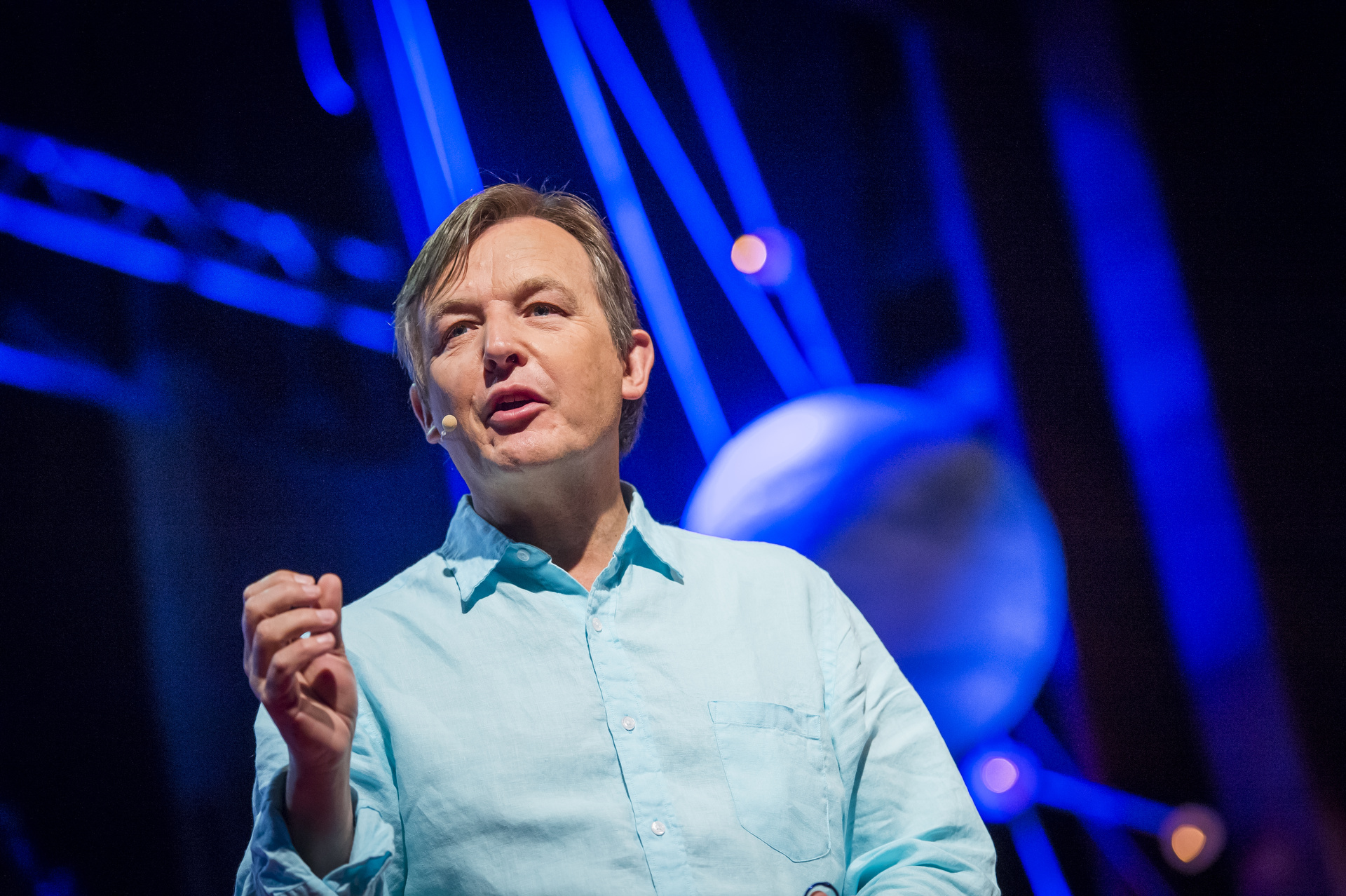
- Anderson in 2013
- Born: 1957 (age 68–69); Pakistan
- Education: Woodstock School; Monkton Combe School; University of Oxford (PPE)
- Occupations: Journalist, publisher
- Known for: Curator of TED Talks; Future Publishing
- Spouses: Lucy Evans (divorced) Jacqueline Novogratz (m. 2008)
- Children: 3 (1 deceased)
- Chris Anderson's voice recorded 26 September 2016
- Website: www.ted.com/speakers/chris_anderson_ted

Chris Anderson (born 1957) is a British-American businessman who is the head of TED, a nonprofit organization that provides idea-based talks and hosts an annual conference in Vancouver, British Columbia, Canada. He is also the founder of video game journalism website IGN.

== Early life and education ==
Anderson was born to British parents in Pakistan in 1957. His father was "an eye surgeon and evangelical Christian" who ran a mobile hospital in rural Pakistan. He has two sisters, and is the middle child.

He briefly studied at Woodstock School in the Himalayan mountains of Mussoorie, India, before moving to Monkton Combe School, a boarding school near Bath, England. He attended University of Oxford, initially studying physics, before changing his major to philosophy, politics and economics and graduating in 1978.

== Career ==
Anderson began his career in journalism, working in newspapers and radio. He produced a world news service in the Seychelles.

After returning to the UK in 1984, Anderson was captivated by the home-computer revolution. He became an editor at two of the UK's early computer magazines, Personal Computer Games and Zzap!64. A year later he founded Future Publishing with a $25,000 bank loan. The new company initially focused on specialist computer publications, but he eventually expanded it into other areas such as cycling, music, video games, technology and design. It doubled in size every year for seven years.

In 1994, Anderson moved to the United States. There he developed Imagine Media, publisher of Business 2.0 magazine and creator of the popular video game users' website IGN. Anderson eventually merged Imagine and Future, taking the combined entity public in London in 1999, under the name Future US. At its peak, it published 150 magazines and websites and employed 2,000 people.

Based on this financial success, Anderson established a private non-profit organization, the Sapling Foundation. He wanted to find new ways to tackle tough global issues through media, technology, entrepreneurship and ideas.

=== TED ===
In 2001, the foundation acquired the TED Conference, then an annual meeting of luminaries in the fields of technology, entertainment and design, held in Monterey, California. Anderson left Future to work full-time on TED.

He expanded the conference to cover all topics, including science, culture, academia, business and key global issues. He added a fellows program, which has about 400 alumni as of 2018. He established the TED Prize, an annual grant to a recipient in support of their "one wish to change the world".

In 2006, TED experimented with posting some of its talks on the Internet. Their viral success encouraged Anderson to develop the organization as a global media initiative devoted to "ideas worth spreading". In June 2015, the organization posted its 2,000th talk online. The talks are free to view. Through a related project, they have been translated into more than 100 languages with the help of thousands of volunteers from around the world. Viewership has grown to approximately one billion views per year.

Continuing a strategy of "radical openness", in 2009 Anderson introduced the TEDx initiative. The TED organization provides free licences to local organizers who want to organize their own TED-like events. Requirements are that speakers must appear for free, and the events have to be non-profit, with talks released to TED through Commons Media. More than 10,000 such events have been held, generating an archive of 100,000 TEDx talks.

Three years later, the TED-Ed program was launched. It offers free educational videos and tools to students and teachers.

In 2012, Anderson was honored with an Edison Achievement Award for his commitment to innovation throughout his career.

In May 2016, Anderson published TED Talks: The Official TED Guide to Public Speaking which offers tips and advice for public speaking. The book became a New York Times bestseller.

In December 2019, Anderson was awarded an Honorary Doctorate of Education by the University of Bath. The award recognises Anderson's 'outstanding services to publishing, education, technology and business'.

In January 2024, Anderson published a book titled Infectious Generosity: The Ultimate Idea Worth Spreading.

In October 2025, Anderson announced that Sal Khan would succeed him as TED’s "vision steward", joining TED’s board to help guide the organization’s long-term mission. Anderson remains on TED’s board and continues to participate in fundraising and programming.

== Personal life ==
Anderson married Lucy Evans. Together they had three daughters, Zoe, Elizabeth and Anna, before their divorce. The eldest, Zoe, died in 2010 at age 24, from carbon monoxide poisoning due to an improperly-installed bathroom boiler.

In 2008, Anderson married Jacqueline Novogratz, the founder and CEO of Acumen, an organization that pioneered social impact investing.
