= Meditative Story =

Mindfulness podcast

- Genre: Meditation / Society & Culture
- Language: English

Cast and voices
- Hosted by: Rohan Gunatillake

Publication
- No. of seasons: 6 (as of August 9, 2023)
- No. of episodes: 100+
- Original release: July 2019
- Provider: WaitWhat
- Updates: Weekly

Related
- Website: meditativestory.com

Meditative Story is a podcast that combines first-person storytelling, mindfulness prompts and original cinematic music, to create a unique listening experience. It is owned and produced by WaitWhat, the media company founded and led by former TED executives, Deron Triff and June Cohen. The first three seasons were created in partnership with Thrive Global, a behavior change technology company led by Arianna Huffington and Dan Katz. Variety describes Meditative Story as “part first-person narrative podcast and part guided meditation.” The podcast is hosted by Rohan Gunatillake and has featured guests such as On Being’s Krista Tippett, A Slight Change of Plans’ Maya Shankar, travel writer Pico Iyer, Grammy award-winning singer-songwriter Jason Mraz, LinkedIn co-founder Reid Hoffman, journalist and amateur boxer Thomas Page McBee, award-winning writer Isabel Allende, comedian Tig Notaro, Grammy award-winning composer and musician Terence Blanchard, actor Randall Park, musician and Leinster Rugby player Niall Breslin, NASA astronomer Michelle Thaller, Peloton exercise instructor Robin Arzón, and MOMA curator Paola Antonelli, among others.

== History ==
The idea for Meditative Story originated with the show's executive producer Deron Triff, who told Forbes “[We're] big believers in storytelling as a vehicle to transform people’s lives... We wanted to blend the storytelling experience with tools and strategies for mindfulness and wellness. Our first call went to Arianna and her team, and we embarked on this venture together." Huffington described the series as “a response to a deep cultural need in our hyper sped up world to have a moment to recharge."

The first episode of Meditative Story, featuring author and surgeon Lucy Kalanithi, aired on July 29, 2019.

In 2021, the team behind Meditative Story launched a spinoff audio series, Meditative Story: Sleep Song, which is available in the Meditative Story podcast feed.

In 2022, the show was distributed by public media organization PRX's Dovetail publishing platform; PRX also provided sponsorship and promotional support.

== Format ==
In each classic episode of Meditative Story a different guest narrates a personal story about a time and place where everything changed for them. All of the stories reflect on a broad theme, like friendship, discovery or loss. The stories are scored with original music, and punctuated by mindfullness prompts from the host Rohan Gunatillake, who also ends each episode with a guided meditation.

The brief mindfulness prompts, which are inserted directly into the narrative, invite listeners to observe and reflect on the details of the scenes and moments the storyteller is describing. And the original sound design for each episode is composed to complement the storyteller's narrative.

There are also meditation episodes which solely feature host Rohan Gunatillake, who walks listeners through a meditation centered on a specific theme, topic or event.

Meditative Story: Sleep Song was created as a “dream score” - a bedtime experience born out of the positive feedback from listeners about the original music composed for the podcast. The immersive melodies from each Meditative Story episode are used to create these custom music-only soundtracks, which are available on the Meditative Story podcast feed.

== Episodes ==
Season 1
Episode	Storyteller	Title	Airdate
1	Lucy Kalanithi	Learning to see things as they are	7/30/2019
2	Pico Iyer	A home that had been waiting for me forever	8/2/2019
3	Arianna Huffington	Life and love and the moment	8/6/2019
4	Larry Jackson	To visualize ... and then make it so	8/13/2019
5	Michelle Thaller	Finding meaning in the vastness of the universe	8/20/2019
6	Dan Harris	Building a bond with my son	8/27/2019
7	Thomas Page McBee	Fighting my fears – and winning in spite of losing	9/3/2019
8	Krista Tippett	What we discover when we're not looking	9/10/2019
9	John Moore	The perfect photograph I never took	9/17/2019
10	Danny Meyer	How to find – and feed – your passion	9/24/2019
11	Jane McGonigal	Finding my own reflection	10/1/2019
12	Peter Sagal	Hitting the open road to find my way home	10/8/2019
13	Josh Radnor	Finding permission to pursue my own dreams	10/15/2019
14	Zenju Earthlyn Manuel	Navigating life in my own skin	10/22/2019
15	Hannah Brencher	One envelope at a time	10/29/2019
16	Stephen Kuusisto	Allowing sound to reveal life's wonder	11/5/2019
17	Catherine Reitman	Surrendering my old identity — and finding myself	11/14/2019
18	Keith Yamashita	Starting the story of my life again	11/19/2019
19	Moj Mahdara	Standing in my own truth	11/26/2019
20	Siri Hustvedt	Learning to see what is in front of me	12/3/2019
21	Susan David	Creating space to stand in truth	12/10/2019
22	A.J. Jacobs	Acting as if you are bold	12/17/2019
23	Sinéad Burke	Finding a way in	1/7/2020
24	Reid Hoffman	Through friendship, a better version of myself	1/13/2020
25	DeRay Mckesson	Making humanity appear, magically	1/20/2020
26	Paola Antonelli	Riding waves	1/27/2020

Season Two
Episode	Storyteller	Title	Airdate
27	Jay Shetty	Learn to see the layers in everyone	3/2/2020
28	Lindsey Stirling	Stories my father told me	3/10/2020
29	Forrest Galante	Adapting to life's unexpected nature	3/17/2020
30	Shea Hembrey	Trust the world to show its goodness	4/4/2020
31	Carl Safina	Loving our living world	4/14/2020
32	Jule Hall	Changing the soundtrack of our lives	4/22/2020
33	Thomas Chatterton Williams	When words fail	4/28/2020
34	Lehua Kamalu	Tracking the path of the sun	5/13/2020
35	Andrew Bird	Listening to the space around you	5/20/2020
36	Elizabeth Lesser	Giving birth to a wiser self	5/27/2020
37	Gretchen Rubin	It's ok to be wrong	6/10/2020
38	Judith Grisel	A more spacious response to life	6/17/2020
39	Rev. Dr. Otis Moss III	Finding unity, through our differences	6/24/2020
40	Angela Ahrendts	Creating my own sanctuary	7/8/2020
41	Donald Miralle	Where the water takes me	7/15/2020
42	Shawn Colvin	What my father gave me	7/22/2020
43	Wajahat Ali	Have faith, but tie your camel first	7/29/2020
44	Lang Lang	Lang Lang: The teacher who asked a new question	8/19/2020
45	Jennifer 8. Lee	That thing I'm missing is what makes me happy	9/2/2020
46	Mickey Guyton	Lean into your uniqueness	9/9/2020
47	Waddie Mitchell	A cowboy's rules for living	9/16/2020
48	Ghuan Featherstone	Discovering the path to honor	9/23/2020
49	Cal Ripken Jr.	Showing up is never an end in itself	10/7/2020
50	Ginger Zee	I'm not just observing the winds, I'm riding them	10/14/2020

Season Three
Episode	Storyteller	Title	Airdate
51	Stephen Wilkes	What's most vital is right in front of me	12/9/2020
52	Nadia Owusu	Home will be with me wherever I go	12/16/2020
53	Kaya Henderson	Nothing beats a failure but a try	12/23/2020
54	Diana Nyad	I couldn't have done it a fingernail better	1/6/2021
55	Jai Punjabi	Twenty-one meals with my family, in seven days	1/14/2021
56	Nalini Nadkarni	The stuff I'm here to study: Life on life on life	1/20/2021
57	David Duchovny	Some lessons take years to sink in	1/27/2021
58	Aasif Mandvi	Getting out of my own head	2/10/2021
59	Sam Harris	Finding happiness amid the ordinary collisions of life	2/17/2021
60	Adam Grant	The fear never goes away. But it can be tamed.	2/24/2021
61	Nate Berkus	Designing your space in the world	3/10/2021
62	Florence Williams	To chase the sunset	3/24/2021
63	Franklin Leonard	Writing the main character	4/2/2021
64	Majora Carter	Do great things – and take your flowers	4/8/2021
65	Michael Imperioli	Having the courage to create	4/15/2021
66	David Whyte	We become the places we love	4/22/2021
67	Omar Wasow	Getting unstuck, reframing the question	5/6/2021
68	Tony Tjan	Learning resilience from earth's edge	5/13/2021
69	Scott Nicholson	Alright after a fateful night	5/19/2021
70	Max Richter	Music, memory, moments	5/27/2021
71	Tri Robinson	To walk the Earth	6/2/2021
72	Robert Reich	The accounting of this parenting business	6/17/2021
73	S.G. Goodman	What holds the world together	6/24/2021
74	Wayne Little	A nurse's story	6/30/2021

Season Four
Episode	Storyteller	Title	Airdate
75	Joel McHale	Appreciating life's random miracles	8/18/2021
76	Laurie R. Santos	My monkey teacher	8/25/2021
77	Kaywin Feldman	Derailed by beauty	9/1/2021
78	Robin Arzón	Do big things one step at a time	9/8/2021
79	Randall Park	The Hollywood version doesn't go like this	9/15/2021
80	Mariann Budde	It doesn't have to be this hard	9/22/2021
81	Russ Ellis	The call of the life that wasn't	9/29/2021
82	Andrew Rea	Living into my true self	10/4/2021
83	Milana Vayntrub	Learning to love my long-distance dad	10/6/2021
84	Dr. Marla Spivak	How the bees saved me	10/13/2021
85	Rev. Monique Ortiz	The heart comes out at night	10/28/2021
86	Steve Almond	My roads diverging	11/3/2021
87	Meredith Arthur	Ignoring inner me	11/12/2021
88	Courtney E. Martin	Finding her to find me	12/1/2021
89	Austin Mao	Peeling back these layers of my inner truth	12/14/2021
90	Beth Lisick	Who is leading who?	12/23/2021
91	Vanessa Hua	From dark times come new discoveries	1/5/2022
92	Gracia Maria	Magic is a serious business	1/28/2022
93	Keith Ferrazzi	The human truth underneath our armor	2/3/2022

Season Five
Episode	Storyteller	Title	Airdate
94	Jacob Sartorius	I take a breath. I buy myself a moment.	3/9/2022
95	Fred Minnick	Experiencing the world through my senses	3/16/2022
96	Morgan Saylor	Trusting love's infinite possibilities	3/23/2022
97	Al Harris	Celebrating a life beyond the score	3/30/2022
98	Silvia Vasquez-Lavado	Discover the power of self-compassion	4/6/2022
99	Kristin Windbigler	We're doing this thing together	4/22/2022
100	Chad Sanders	Finding my flow state	4/28/2022
101	Matthew Mercer	The magic that ripples out when we share our passions with others	5/12/2022
102	Isha Sesay	Forging my own path	5/19/2022
103	Dallas Taylor	I focus on sensations that ground me	5/28/2022
104	Gordana Biernat	A funny rush of surprise	6/8/2022
105	Sharon Salzberg	How I found kindness as my compass	6/24/2022
106	Hrishikesh Hirway	Giving myself permission to create	6/30/2022
107	Maya Shankar	The joy of being an unwilling traveler through life	7/14/2022
108	Morgan Harper Nichols	Belonging can be found far from home	7/23/2022
109	Steven Ho	The magic beyond our boundaries	7/29/2022
110	Henry Shukman	What deep listening unlocks for me	8/19/2022
111	Nataly Dawn	My battle as a beginner opens up a world of wonder	8/26/2022
112	Lex Gillette	To be seen on my own terms	9/1/2022
113	Joe Wicks	Racing toward passion and away from fear	9/8/2022
114	Carla Hall	My year of play	9/15/2022
115	Mark Nepo	On board with my dad	9/22/2022
116	Kino MacGregor	My grandfather the Aikido master	9/29/2022
117	Shani Tran	Mud, sweat, and tears	10/13/2022
118	Rachel Cargle	My side hustle to a better life	11/3/2022
119	Alex Morris	Dancing on my own	11/10/2022

Season Six
Episode	Storyteller	Title	Airdate
120	Case Kenny	Notes to self	11/17/2022
121	Sara Benincasa	The last laugh	12/1/2022
122	Tom Mustill	The beetle and the whale	12/8/2022
123	Cristina Mittermeier	When the sharks start to circle	12/22/2022
124	Timothy Shriver	Changing the game	1/5/2023
125	Eric Whitacre	To swim in a sea of stars	1/12/2023
126	Jade Bowler	Finding magic in the quiet moments	1/26/2023
127	Hannah Cross	The power of a simple loving presence	2/9/2023
128	Curtis Rivers	Making adjustments in free fall	2/16/2023
129	Isabel Allende	From great loss, a great freedom	3/2/2023
130	AD	Finding possibility in life's forced pauses	3/9/2023
131	Varshini Prakash	Together, we move from fear to hope	3/23/2023
132	Zuri Adele	How I connect to my unique place in history	3/30/2023
133	Bakari Sellers	Reducing anxiety 24 hours at a time	4/6/2023
134	Chip Conley	The secret to aging well	4/18/2023
135	Felix Barrett	There's beauty in breaking the rules	5/3/2023
136	Terence Blanchard	Reaching our full potential is not a solo act	5/9/2023
137	Niall Breslin	Learning to heal by learning to feel	5/16/2023
138	Tig Notaro	There's more than one way to get there	5/23/2023
139	Garrett McNamara	Embracing everything life has to offer	6/6/2023
140	Jason Mraz	Finding the energy we need, all around us	6/13/2023
141	Duff Goldman	Speaking without words	6/20/2023
142	Meredith Goldstein	Letting go of the need to do it all	7/5/2023
143	Soledad O’Brien	Seeing the potential in others and ourselves	7/11/2023
144	Leila Day	Learning to share our honest, imperfect stories	7/20/2023
144	Zoe Lister-Jones	Finding your voice when you need it the most	8/8/2023

Season Seven
Episode	Storyteller	Title	Airdate
145	Eddie Huang	There's nobody like you	8/15/2023
146	Rohan Gunatillake	The spaces that give our lives meaning	8/17/2023
147	Kathryn Nicolai	Asking for what we need	8/22/2023
148	Rohan Gunatillake	Getting curious about how we learn	8/24/2023
149	Andrea Gibson	Let your body be the guide	8/29/2023
150	Adam Grant	Practice taming your fear	9/5/2023
151	Tamron Hall	Give yourself permission to believe	9/12/2023
152	Martha Beck	Letting our hearts take the lead	9/19/2023
153	Jessamyn Stanley	You are enough, messiness and all	9/26/2023
154	Rohan Gunatillake	Calming the mind and body for sleep	9/28/2023
155	Joseph Goldstein	It's ok not to know	10/3/2023
156	Carla Hall	The power of play	10/10/2023
157	Rohan Gunatillake	Embrace a life full of possibility	10/17/2023
158	Indy Officinalis	How the natural world connects us all	10/19/2023
159	Louie Schwartzberg	Cherishing every moment in time	10/25/2023
160	Rohan Gunatillake	A trick for finding warmth and comfort	10/30/2023
161	Mirna Valerio	The strength we seek is all around us	11/7/2023
162	Rohan Gunatillake	Small acts of kindness for ourselves and others	11/9/2023
163	Kim Fields	Rewrite your inner monologue	11/14/2023
164	Diana Nyad	Giving life everything we’ve got	11/21/2023
165	What kindness means to us	-	11/28/2023
166	Suneel Gupta	Embrace every part of yourself	12/5/2023
167	Matthieu Ricard	Let the symphony of life unfold all around you	12/12/2023

Season Eight
Episode	Storyteller	Title	Airdate
168	Rohan Gunatillake	Feeling safe, sound, and at peace while you travel	12/14/2023
169	Rohan Gunatillake	New beginnings, endless possibilities	12/28/2023
170	Jon Foreman	Creative potential is everywhere	1/9/2024
171	Dr. Kwane Stewart	Rediscover the roots of your joy	1/16/2024

== Reception & Awards ==
Meditative Story has received strong praise from Variety, Forbes, Wired, The Today Show, CBC Radio and others. Forbes describes it as "a completely new kind of listening experience that blends intimate first-person stories with mindfulness prompts, enveloped in beautiful music composition.” It was named one of the Top Podcasts of 2019 by Canada's CBC Radio

Awards
Award	Year	Category	Recipient	Result	Ref.
Webby	2024	Best Original Music Score / Sound Design	Ep: "From great loss, a great freedom" by Isabel Allende	Won	
Webby	2024	Best Featured Guest	Ep: "From great loss, a great freedom" by Isabel Allende	Honoree	
Webby	2023	Best Episode, Health & Wellness	Ep: "Heading halfway around the world to find myself" by Morgan Harper Nichols	Nominated	
Webby	2023	Best Individual Episode	Ep: "Heading halfway around the world to find myself" by Morgan Harper Nichols	Honoree	
Webby	2023	Best Episode, Health, Wellness, and Lifestyle	Ep: "The joy of being an unwilling traveler through life" by Maya Shankar	Nominated	
Webby	2023	Best Episode, Lifestyle	Ep: "Finding magic in the quiet moments" by Jade Bowler	Honoree	
Signal	2023	Best Bedtime Podcast	Ep: "Finding My Flow State", by Chad Sanders	Won	
Signal	2023	Best Driveway Moment Podcast	Choosing compassion over conquest, by Silvia Vasquez-Lavado	Nominated	
Signal	2023	Best Health & Wellness Podcast	Meditative Story: Learning to heal by learning to feel, By Niall Breslin	Won	
Signal	2023	Best Self-Improvement & Self-Help Podcast	From great loss, a great freedom by Isabel Allende	Won	
Signal	2022	Best Individual Episode: Diversity, Equity & Inclusion	Writing the Main Character, by Franklin Leonard	Won	
Signal	2022	Best Individual Episode: Religion & Spirituality	Sharon Salzberg: How I Found Kindness as My Compass	Won	
Signal	2022	Best Commute Podcast	Robert Reich: The Accounting of This Parenting Business	Won	
Signal	2022	Best Individual Episode: Health & Wellness	I Focus on Sensations That Ground Me, by Dallas Taylor	Won	
Signal	2022	Most Inspirational Podcast	Meditative Story	Won	
Signal	2022	Most Innovative Audio Experience	Meditative Story	Won	
Signal	2022	Best Religion & Spirituality Podcast	Meditative Story	Won	
Signal	2022	Best Episode, Health and Wellness	Ep: "Finding My Flow State", by Chad Sanders	Won	
Webby	2022	Best Episode in Television and Film	Ep: "The Hollywood version doesn’t go like this" by Randall Park	Won	
Webby	2022	Best Episode in Health & Wellness	Ep: "The Hollywood version doesn’t go like this" by Randall Park	Won	
Webby	2022	Best Individual Episode	Eps: "When the student is ready, the master will be long gone" by David Duchovny and "One beating heart" by Joel McHale	Honoree	
Webby	2022	Best Health, Wellness & Lifestyle Podcast	Robin Arzón on Meditative Story: Even a superhero starts with small steps	Honoree	
Webby	2022	Best Individual Episode - Television & Film	Meditative Story	Nominated	
Ambie	2022	Best Personal Growth / Spirituality Podcast	Meditative Story	Nominated	
Ambie	2021	Best Personal Growth / Spirituality Podcast	Meditative Story	Nominated	
Webby	2021	Best Health, Wellness & Lifestyle Podcast	Meditative Story	Honoree	
Webby	2021	Best Individual Episode, Arts and Culture	Ep: "America’s Jam Session" by Rev. Dr. Otis Moss III	Honoree	Cite
Webby	2021	Best Individual Episode, DEI	Ep: "Discovering the path to honor" by Ghuan Featherstone	Honoree	Cite
Webby	2021	Best Arts & Culture Podcast	Pastor Otis Moss	Honoree	
Webby	2020	Best Health, Wellness, & Lifestyle podcast	Meditative Story	Honoree	
