= Behavioural Insights Team =

UK-based social engineering organisation

- Type: Social purpose company
- Industry: Consulting
- Predecessor: Cabinet Office Behavioural Insights Team
- Founded: 2010
- Headquarters: 58 Victoria Embankment, London, United Kingdom EC4Y 0DS
- Area served: Global
- Key people: David Halpern, President Emeritus
- Owner: Nesta
- Number of employees: 100 – 500
- Website: www.bi.team

The Behavioural Insights Team (BIT), known unofficially as the "Nudge Unit", is a UK-based global social purpose organisation that generates and applies behavioural insights to inform policy and improve public services, following nudge theory. Using social engineering, as well as techniques in psychology, behavioral economics, and marketing, the purpose of the organisation is to influence public thinking and decision making in order to improve compliance with government policy and thereby decrease social and government costs related to inaction and poor compliance with policy and regulation. The Behavioural Insights Team has been headed by British psychologist David Halpern since its formation.

Originally set up in 2010 within the UK Cabinet Office to apply nudge theory within British government, BIT expanded into a limited company in 2014 and is now fully owned by British charity Nesta. Today, its work spans across several regions, having run more than 1,800 projects including 400 randomised controlled trial (RCTs) in various countries. With its headquarters in London and another UK location in Manchester, BIT also has offices in the United States (New York and Washington, DC); Singapore; Australia (Sydney); New Zealand (Wellington); France (Paris); and Canada (Toronto).

== History ==
BIT was set up in 2010 by the 2010–15 coalition government of the United Kingdom in a probationary fashion. It was established at the Cabinet Office and headed by psychologist David Halpern.

In April 2013, it was announced that BIT would be partially privatised as a mutual joint venture.

In 2016, BIT won a $3.75m from the Global Innovation Fund.

On 5 February 2014, BIT's ownership was split equally between the government, the charity Nesta, and the team's employees, with Nesta providing £1.9 million in financing and services. Reportedly this was "the first time the [UK] government has privatised civil servants responsible for policy decisions." The Financial Times expected it "to be the first of many policy teams to be spun off as part of plans to shrink central government and create a private enterprise culture in Whitehall."

In December 2021, the group became wholly owned by Nesta.

== Overview ==
The mission of the organisation is to inform policy and improve public services for citizens and society. In reporting achievements, annual update reports are published highlighting key areas of focus addressed.

UK government departments that had previously received policy advice for free now pay for the service, as the cost of maintaining the team is no longer borne by government.

=== Methods ===
Although specific ideas devised by BIT have been imitated in several other countries (see below), President Emeritus David Halpern said in a 2018 interview with Apolitical that the unit's underlying methodology has still not been widely understood. He said BIT's "greatest legacy" would not be any individual behavioural insight, but rather its commitment to creating a set of variants on any given intervention and testing them against each other. He called the cycle of making variants, testing them, learning what works best and starting again from there "radical incrementalism."

BIT follows a basic, linear process combining fieldwork and behavioural science literature in approaching projects. This four-step methodology involves defining the outcome, understanding the context, building the intervention and finishing by testing, learning and adapting. In testing, BIT heavily uses randomised control trials to increase the evidence base and take an empirical approach to government.

=== Governance and affiliations ===
BIT is headed by CEO Rachel Coyle MBE, and is now owned by the charity Nesta. It works in partnership with governments, local authorities, non-profits, and private organisations to tackle major policy problems.

The organisation has a formal partnership with Harvard University’s Behavioral Insights Group (BIG) and close relationships with several universities, including University College London, Harvard University, and the Universities of Oxford, Cambridge, and Pennsylvania.

As of October 2025, members of the BIT global board include:

- Ed Richards – Chair
- Ravi Gurumurthy – Group Chief Executive Officer for Nesta and BIT
- Andrew Chittenden – Non-executive director
- Hurol Inan – Non-executive director
- Jane Ellison – Non-executive director
- Sebastian Salomon-Ballada – Principal Advisor

As of May 2021, academic affiliates of the BIT include:

- Angela Duckworth – founder and CEO of Character Lab
- Cass Sunstein – professor at Harvard Law School; co-author of Nudge (2008).
- Daniel Goldstein – principal researcher at Microsoft Research
- David Zendle – lecturer of computer science at the University of York
- Elizabeth Linos – assistant professor of public policy at UC Berkeley
- Gus O'Donnell – Member of the House of Lords; former Cabinet Secretary; former head of the Civil Service
- Michael Norton – professor of business administration at the Harvard Business School
- Michelle Ryan – professor of social and organisational psychology at the University of Exeter
- Nick Chater – professor of behavioural science at Warwick Business School
- Oliver Hauser – senior lecturer in economics at University of Exeter
- Peter John – professor of political science and public policy at University College London
- Peter Tufano – dean of Said Business School, University of Oxford
- Richard Thaler – professor of behavioural science and economics at the Chicago Booth School of Business; co-author of Nudge (2008).
- Rob Ranyard – visiting professor at the Centre for Decision Research, Leeds University Business School
- Silvia Saccardo – assistant professor at the Department of Social and Decision Sciences, Carnegie Mellon University
- Simon Burgess – professor of economics at the University of Bristol
- Thekla Morgenroth – Research Fellow of Social and Organisational Psychology, University of Exeter
- Theresa Marteau – director of the Behaviour and Health Research Unit, University of Cambridge
- Todd Rogers – professor of public policy, Harvard Kennedy School

== Projects ==
=== Using social norms to increase tax payments ===
In the UK, BIT tested the impact of tax payment reminders with carefully constructed messages to cue individuals to make tax payments. BIT partnered with Her Majesty's Revenue and Customs (HMRC) to assess the effectiveness of norm-based and public good statements in prompting taxpayers to pay on time. The norm-based statements gave statistics showing the timeliness of conscientious individuals paying their tax on time and that the individual was not part of this group as they had failed to pay on time. Additionally, the public good statements illustrated the beneficial public services the individual would have access to if taxes were paid on time and the poor social outcomes that could happen if the individual did not pay tax on time.

The outcomes of the trials indicated an increase in likelihood of individuals paying tax on time, with the norm-based statements increasing total taxes paid within 23 days by more than £1.6 million.

=== Increasing fine payment rates through text messages ===
BIT prompted those owing the UK Courts Service fines with a text message ten days before the bailiffs were to be sent to a person, which doubled payments made without the need for further intervention. This innovation has reportedly saved the Courts Service £30 million a year by "sending people owing fines personalised text messages to persuade them to pay promptly."

Similarly, the Behavioural Economics Team of the Australian Government (BETA) conducted a trial with the Australian Department of Human Services on timely reminders to report on time. Individuals on welfare payments for job seekers and students are required to report their income every fortnight before the payment is made. This is essential for the accuracy of payments. Over 80,000 individuals are late for reporting every fortnight which can result in the cancellation of payments.

BETA designed three different SMS reminders to be sent the day before reporting was due. The SMS messages included a short reminder, a cost-emphasising reminder and a benefits-emphasising reminder. The findings illustrate that any SMS option increased the number of individuals reporting by 13.5% at a faster rate than ones who did not receive a text. This further led to 1.7% in fewer payment cancellations.

=== Increasing loft insulation installation ===
Although loft insulation is essentially a zero-risk proposition, there were very few people installing it. The team discovered that people's lofts were full of junk, and provided low-cost labour to clear them; this caused a fivefold increase in the proportion of installed insulation.

In June 2012, they published a policy paper on the use of randomised controlled trials in collaboration with Ben Goldacre.

=== Benefit sanctions for disabled people ===
Tasked by the Department for Work and Pensions to investigate the effectiveness of "sanctioning" recipients of disability benefits (punishing them with fines of up to three years ineligibility to benefits for supposed bad attitudes or non-compliance), the nudge unit noted that these methods were ineffective, but rather than recommending they be withdrawn, proposed changes which might make sanctions and benefit conditionality more effective.

== Locations and international adoption ==
Behavioural insights has been used by governments across the world to successfully improve outcomes in numerous policy, program, and service areas, including retirement savings, access to post-secondary education, on-time tax payment, and healthcare. The OECD notes that 202 organisations around the world have applied behavioural insights to public policy. Many of these organisations have established their own behavioural insight teams to research the field of behavioural economics. These teams include the Behavioural Insights Unit (BIU) in the New South Wales Government and the Behavioural Economics Team of the Australian Government (BETA) in the Australian Government. Meanwhile, Harvard University and the Government of British Columbia individually have a Behavioral Insights Group (BIG and BC BIG, respectively).

=== North America ===
The North American operation of BIT is working with cities and their agencies, as well as other partners, across the United States and Canada, running over 25 randomized controlled trials in the first year of operation.

==== Canada ====
The BIT Canada office at Toronto, Ontario, opened in October 2019, working with all levels of government (municipal, provincial, and federal), as well as nonprofits and foundations. Clients of BIT Canada include the Government of Canada, Government of British Columbia, Rideau Hall Foundation, Ontario Securities Commission, University Health Network, and the Region of Peel. The Director of BIT Canada is Sasha Tregebov.

In 2016, Employment and Social Development Canada and the Privy Council Office's Impact and Innovation Unit (IIU; formerly Innovation Hub) launched the Behavioural Insights Community of Practice (BI CoP), a horizontal network of employees, practitioners, and researchers across the government that allows for sharing information, research methodologies, and experimentation results. This community of practice has an open model, wherein all Canadian public servants at all levels are able to take part. BI CoP also has a mandate to "include education, training, and awareness-building."

Complementing the internal BI CoP, the IIU established a Behavioural Insights Network to bring together provincial, territorial, and municipal governments in Canada that work in the field of behavioural insights.

Various provincial governments in Canada also operate nudge units:

- Government of British Columbia – Behavioral Insights Group (BC BIG), a unit of the BC Public Service Agency.
- Government of Ontario – Ontario Behavioural Insights Unit, a unit of the Centre of Excellence for Evidence-Based Decision Making, Treasury Board Secretariat

==== United States ====
BIT has expanded to the United States, setting up an office in New York City as well as in Washington, DC. The New York office works both in the United States and internationally, whereas the DC office was established in early 2020 to focus on the United States itself, with partnerships at all levels of government.

During his terms, U.S. President Barack Obama sought to employ nudge theory to advance American domestic policy goals. In 2008, the federal government appointed Cass Sunstein, who helped develop the theory, as administrator of the Office of Information and Regulatory Affairs.

The federal Office of Science and Technology Policy also has a "Social and Behavioral Sciences Initiative," whose goal is "to translate academic research findings into improvements in federal program performance and efficiency using rigorous evaluation methods." On 15 September 2015, Obama issued an Executive Order that formally established the Social and Behavioral Sciences Team and directed government agencies to use insights from the social and behavioral sciences to improve the efficiency and effectiveness of their work.

=== Asia-Pacific ===
==== Oceania ====
BIT has an office in Sydney, Australia, and in Wellington, New Zealand. Expansion into Oceania began at a state-level, followed by the setup of teams on a sub-national level. The Wellington office was established in 2016, working with central and local government clients including Ministry of Social Development, the Ministry of Primary Industries, and the New Zealand Police.

In 2012, BIT Australia worked with the state Government of New South Wales (NSW) to establish the Behavioural Insights Unit (BIU) at the Department of Premier and Cabinet (now in the Department of Customer Service), intended to provide policy advice and support to NSW Government agencies. In 2016, the federal government created its own "Nudge Unit" at the Department of the Prime Minister and Cabinet called the Behavioural Economics Team of the Australian Government (BETA) to apply behavioural insights into public policy.

==== Southeast Asia ====
Having worked with agencies of the Singaporean government since 2012, BIT opened a permanent office in the city-state in 2016 following successful work with the Ministry of Manpower, the Public Services Division of the Prime Minister’s Office, and the Ministry of Home Affairs, among other departments. Work in Singapore has focused on improving social policy in consideration to empiricism and social impact.

The ASEAN-Australia Strategic Youth Partnership has expressed consideration for establishing a centralised behavioural economics team for the region as a modest investment which can deliver measurable benefits for ASEAN communities.

=== Europe ===
BIT's global headquarters are based in London, not too far from 10 Downing Street, where the team was originally formed.

BIT North was established in Manchester, UK, in 2016. Working in close partnership with the Greater Manchester Combined Authority and the Greater Manchester Health and Social Care Partnership, BIT North focuses on various local issues, from recycling to education to health and social care.

==== France ====
BIT has been operating in France since 2018, initially through a framework agreement with the Direction Interministerielle de la Transformation Publique (DITP; 'Interministerial Directorate of Public Transformation'), under the ministère de la Transformation et Fonction publiques ('Ministry of Transformation and Public Service').

As work grew in France, BIT opened its Paris office in 2020, its first permanent office in continental Europe, with a team of advisors transferring over from London. BIT France is headed by Laura Litvine.

=== Organizations ===
According to the OECD, 202 institutions globally have applied behavioural insights to public policy, and many of these firms have established their own behavioural insight teams to undergo behavioural research (including in behavioural economics) and policy solutions.

- Harvard University (US) – Behavioral Insights Group (BIG)
- NITI Aayog (India) – Behavioural Insights Unit
- Rotman School of Management (Canada) – Behavioural Economics in Action at Rotman (BEAR)
- UBC Sauder School of Business (Canada) – Decision Insights for Business and Society (DIBS)
- University of Cambridge (UK) – Cambridge University Behavioural Insights Team (CUBIT)
- PricewaterhouseCoopers (Canada)

== See also ==
- Information Research Department
- Homeland Security Group
- Tell MAMA
