= June Cohen =

American producer and entrepreneur

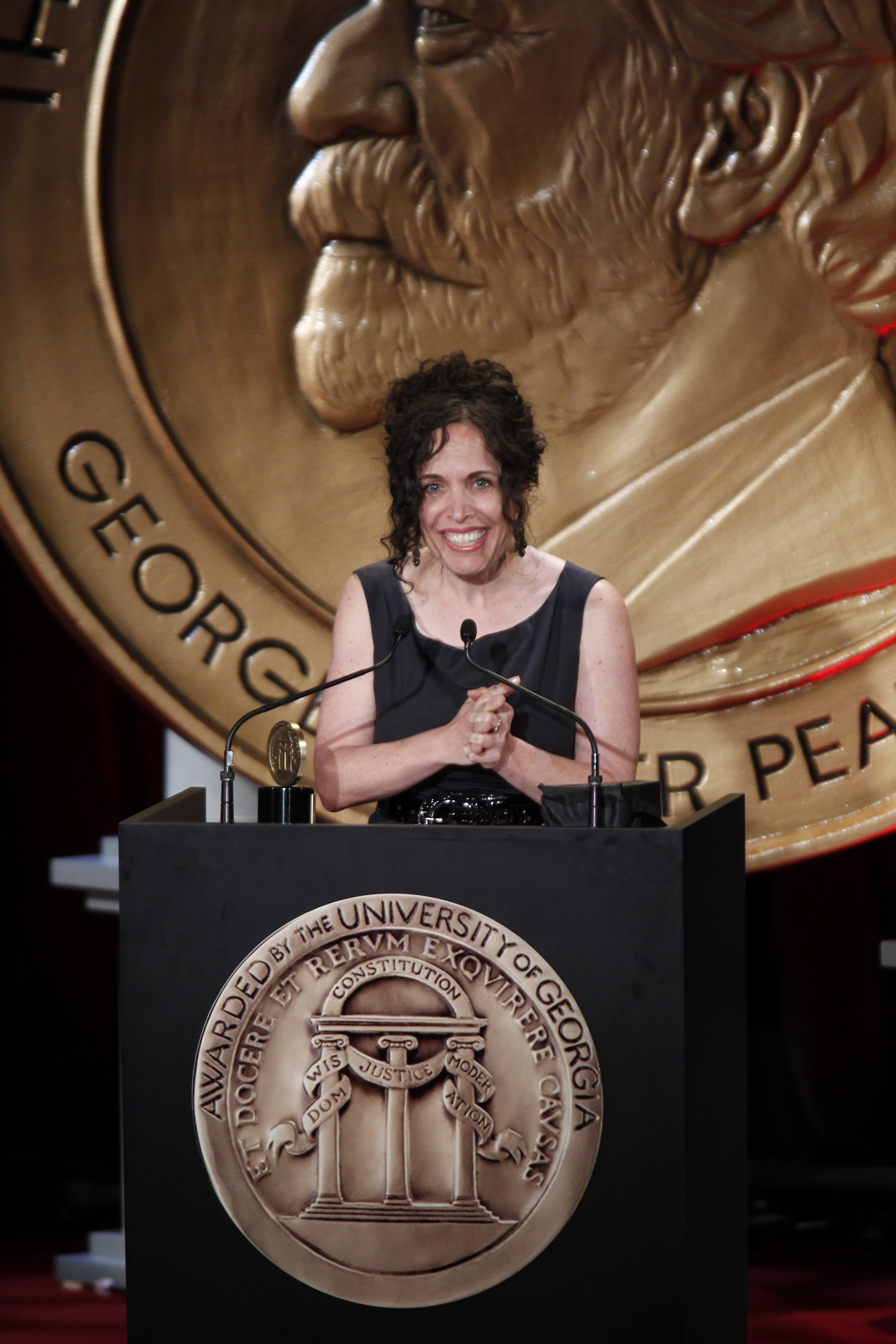
- Cohen in 2012
- Education: Stanford University (BA)
- Occupations: Producer; entrepreneur
- Years active: 1991-present

June Cohen is an American producer and entrepreneur. She is the CEO of WaitWhat, a media company she co-founded with Deron Triff. WaitWhat creates the podcasts Masters of Scale with Reid Hoffman, Should This Exist?, Meditative Story, and Spark & Fire. Cohen was also host of the podcast Sincerely X in its first season. Until December 2015, she was the Executive Producer of TED Media for TED (Technology, Entertainment, Design). She led the effort to bring the conference online, launching the podcast series TEDTalks in 2006, the redesigned TED.com in 2007, the TED Open Translation Project in 2009, the TED Open TV Project in 2010 and TED Conversations in 2011. Cohen joined the TED staff in 2005. She also produced TED's year-round salons, edited the TED Blog, and co-curated and co-hosted the annual conference in Long Beach, with TED curator Chris Anderson. She lives in New York City.

== Early career ==
Cohen holds a BA in political science from Stanford University (minors in human biology, anthropology, African studies), where she was Editor-in-Chief of The Stanford Daily, which she describes as "another formative experience that has influenced everything I've done since."

Cohen was an early innovator in new media. In 1991, she led a team at Stanford University that developed the world's first networked multimedia magazines, called "Proteus". It was built in HyperCard, and used newly released QuickTime to integrate video. It was made available over the campus computer network, as a supplement to the campus newspaper, and was phased out after the advent of the web.

From 1994 to 2000, Cohen worked for HotWired, the pioneering website from Wired magazine, which introduced many of the conventions now commonplace on the web—it was the first website to introduce a membership system, a commenting system, and ad banners. She was part of the team that launched the site in 1994, and from 1997-2000, as the young Vice President of Content, she helped lead HotWired to profitability. She also oversaw all creative development on sites, from Animation Express to the HotBot search engine. She wrote the Net Surf blog from 1994 to 1996. In 1996 she launched Webmonkey, the how-to site for web developers. In 1997, she led the widely publicized launch of "HotWired 4.0," which featured extensive use of JavaScript and "dynamic HTML."

After leaving Wired magazine, Cohen wrote "The Unusually Useful Web Book" in 2003, hailed by critics as "an instant classic" and translated into four languages.

== TED.com ==
After joining the TED team in 2005, Cohen soon hired a filmmaker specializing in the Web, Jason Wishnow, and began planning TED's first video podcast. Ever since Chris Anderson had, in 2001, acquired the TED conference—an elite, expensive, annual event, isolated from the world at large—he was looking for ways to make the talks available to a wider audience beyond the conference. June Cohen tried to interest TV stations in a TV show consisting largely of TEDTalks, but was told that the lectures lacked mainstream appeal. "When the BBC told me that TED talks were too intellectual for them, I thought it was time to change strategies," In June 2006, a small batch of free videos were posted online, under Attribution-NonCommercial-NoDerivs Creative Commons license. By January of the next year, 44 talks had been put online, and they had been viewed 3 million times. Based on that success, TED pumped hundreds of thousands of dollars into its video production operations and into the development of a Web site to showcase about 100 of the talks. "Conventional business logic would tell you that in a community like TED you have to keep your commodity scarce and expensive to retain brand value," she said in an interview. "But the same year we started releasing most of our content for free we raised our conference price by nearly 50 percent and still sold out in 12 days."

In 2007, the new TED.com was launched, designed by Method, a design firm based in New York and San Francisco. The website has won numerous awards, including seven Webby Awards, iTunes Best Podcast of the Year (2006-2010), the Communication Arts 2007 Interactive Award for Information Design, the 2008 OMMA award for video sharing, the 2008 Web Visionary Award for technical achievement, the 2008 One Show Interactive Bronze Award, the AIGA Annual Design Competition (2009) and a 2012 Peabody Award. TED.com has been featured in two major design exhibits, at the London Design Museum and the Denver Art Museum. It was named one of the 50 Best Websites of 2010 by Time magazine, and has received praise from various media outlets, including The New York Times, The Guardian, and Design Week. According to announcements made at the TED Conference in February 2010, TEDTalks were watched 250 million times in the first 3½ years they were available. By July 2012, the talks had been viewed more than 800 million times. Some of the talks, like those by Hans Rosling, Ken Robinson and Jill Bolte Taylor have become viral hits. "Putting the talks online free was risky and it turned out really well for us," Cohen has said in an interview. "It turned our audience of 1,000 conference attendees into an audience of 150 million people worldwide."

== WaitWhat - media company ==
In 2017, Cohen co-founded WaitWhat, a media company, with Deron Triff, TED's former head of media partnerships and distribution. On their respective roles at TED, Cohen says, "I led the startup phase, when we got TEDTalks online, and Deron led the scale-up phase, when it got to 100 million views each month.” WaitWhat is described as a media invention company that's format and platform agnostic. WaitWhat has publicly committed to a 50/50 gender balance, both in the podcast Masters of Scale, and among its investors. The company raised a $1.1M seed round, from a gender-balanced group of 12 angel investors, by raising money from women investors first.

- Masters of Scale: In 2017, WaitWhat launched its first multimedia property - the Masters of Scale podcast hosted by Reid Hoffman. Masters of Scale aims to “democratize entrepreneurship”. The podcast has featured interviews with well-known founders and leaders including Airbnb co-founder and CEO Brian Chesky, Netflix co-founder Reed Hastings, Uber CEO Dara Khosrowshahi, Huffington Post & Thrive Global founder Arianna Huffington, Ariel Investments co-CEO Mellody Hobson, and President Barack Obama. Over the course of each podcast episode, Hoffman and his guests share entrepreneurial insights and their entrepreneurial experiences. Masters of Scale won multiple Webby and Signal Awards in 2022. Cohen served as the guest host for two episodes featuring Reid Hoffman as the guest. Since 2017, the property Masters of Scale has extended into multiple additional audio series, a learning app, a book, and events.
- Should This Exist: In February 2019, WaitWhat launched the podcast Should This Exist? — "an original audio series that aims to explore technology’s impact on humanity." This show is hosted by Internet entrepreneur Caterina Fake.
- Meditative Story: In August 2019, WaitWhat launched the podcast Meditative Story, in partnership with Thrive Global — a media company led by Arianna Huffington. The podcast combines first-person stories with meditation prompts and original music, to create a mindfulness experience in audio. Variety describes it as “part first-person narrative podcast and part guided meditation” Forbes describes it as "a completely new kind of listening experience that blends intimate first-person stories with mindfulness prompts, enveloped in beautiful music composition." Deron Triff, executive producer of Meditative Story, told Forbes “We wanted to blend the storytelling experience with tools and strategies for mindfulness and wellness." The podcast's first season featured stories from Krista Tippett (host of the radio show On Being), NPR Host Peter Sagal, travel writer Pico Iyer, LinkedIn cofounder Reid Hoffman, Beautycon Media's Moj Mahdara, actor Josh Radnor and astronomer Michelle Thaller, among others. Meditative Story appears on Apple Podcasts, Spotify, and other podcast distribution platforms.
- Spark & Fire: In January 2021, WaitWhat launched Spark & Fire – a podcast that “celebrates the creativity of the world’s most admired creators, turning the abstract idea of the ‘creative process’ into a captivating, edge-of-your-seat hero’s journey” – in partnership with Skillshare. The podcast’s first season features stories from guests including Soul co-director Kemp Powers, Knives Out writer and director Rian Johnson, The Orchid Thief author Susan Orlean, Jurassic Park cover designer Chip Kidd, House of Sprits author Isabel Allende, choreographer Bill T. Jones, cellist Yo-Yo Ma, and Apollo Theater Executive Producer Kamilah Forbes.

== Other projects ==
The Possible VR Series: In 2017, Cohen and collaborator Deron Triff partnered with filmmaker Chris Milk and Aaron Koblin and their Virtual Reality company Within to create The Possible, a 5-part documentary series filmed in VR. It is credited as being one of the first documentary series created in VR. Several of the episodes were directed by David Gelb.

Sincerely, X podcast: Cohen hosted the first season of the podcast Sincerely X, which features anonymous TED Talks. The anonymous speakers included a doctor who believed she killed a patient; a Silicon Valley executive who experienced a mental breakdown; a yoga instructor who unleashed pepper spray in a department store; and a woman in a violent marriage who invented a ritual that she believes saved her life. The series is created as a co-production between TED and Audible. The executive producers are Deron Triff and Colin Campbell. The first episode aired on Audible on February 1, 2017, and became available publicly on iTunes on July 19, 2017. Sincerely X received a 2018 Gracie Award for the episode “Rescued by Ritual.”

== Personal interests ==
June Cohen describes herself as "passionate about the visual and performing arts". She spent a large part of her younger life on stage. In several periods, she saw "literally every show on Broadway". She also describes herself as "a tremendous science geek, a voracious reader, a passionate traveler, an on-again, off-again photographer and a devoted life-long learner."
