= Arianna Huffington =

Greek and American businesswoman (born 1950)

- Αριάδνη Στασινοπούλου
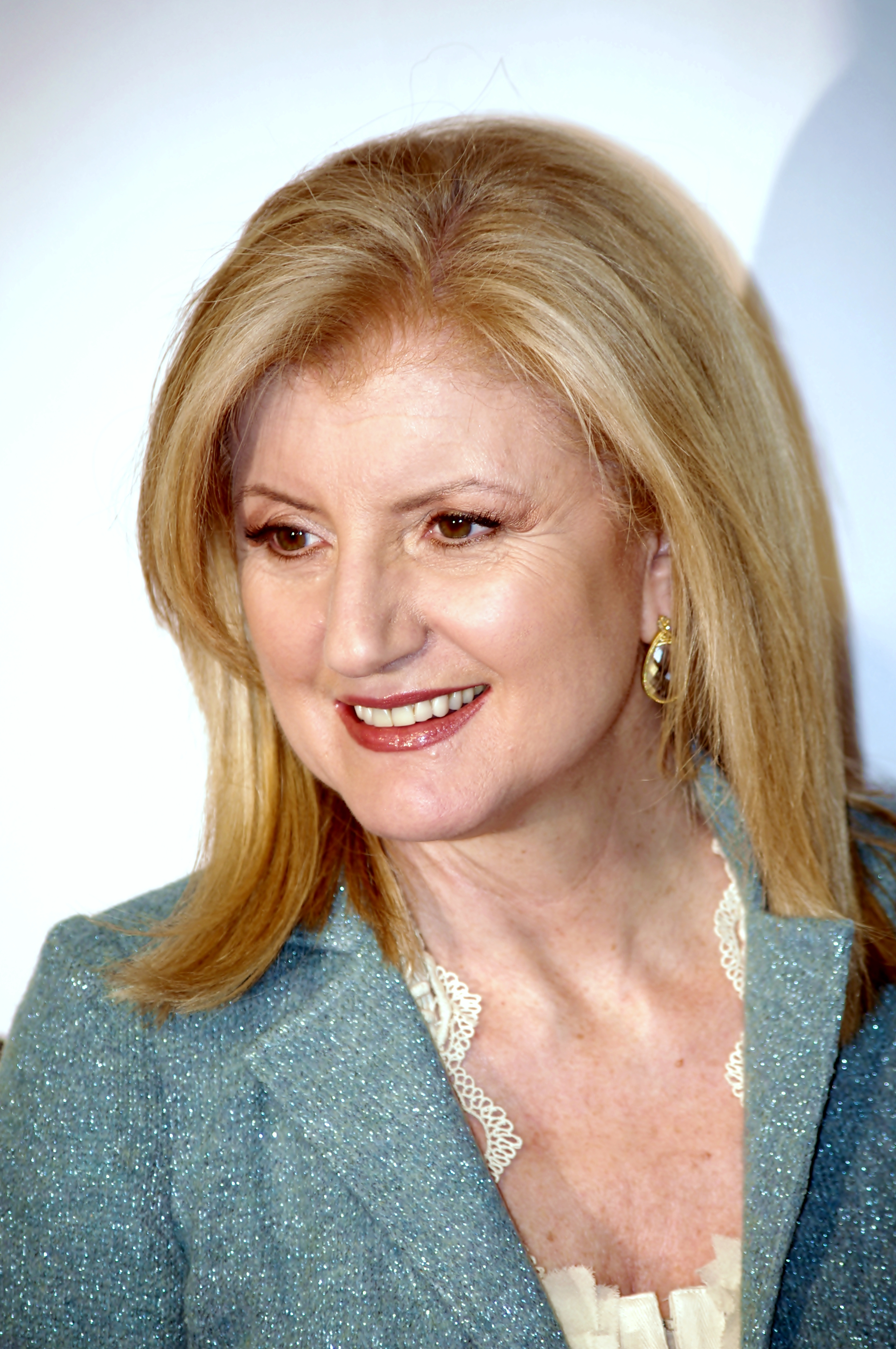
- Huffington at the 2011 Tribeca Film Festival
- Born: Ariadnē-Anna Stassinopoúlou; July 15, 1950 (age 76); Athens, Greece
- Citizenship: Greece; United States (since 1990)
- Education: Girton College, Cambridge (BA)
- Known for: Founder of The Huffington Post; Founder and CEO of Thrive Global; Author of 15 books
- Political party: Democratic (since 2004)
- Other political affiliations: Republican (before 2003); Independent (2003–2004)
- Spouse: Michael Huffington (m. 1986; div. 1997)
- Children: 2

Arianna Stassinopoulos Huffington (née Ariadnē-Anna Stasinopoúlou; Greek: Αριάδνη-Άννα Στασινοπούλου, pronounced [ariˈaðni ˈana stasinoˈpulu]; born July 15, 1950) is a Greek and American author, syndicated columnist and businesswoman.

She is a co-founder of HuffPost, the founder and CEO of Thrive Global, and the author of fifteen books. She has been named in Time magazine's list of the world's 100 most influential people and the Forbes Most Powerful Women list. Huffington serves on numerous boards, including Onex and Global Citizen.

Two of her books have been dogged by allegations of plagiarism, for one of which she paid another author an out-of-court settlement. Her last two books, Thrive: The Third Metric to Redefining Success and Creating a Life of Well-Being, Wisdom, and Wonder and The Sleep Revolution: Transforming Your Life, One Night at a Time, both became international bestsellers.

Huffington, the former wife of Republican congressman Michael Huffington, co-founded The Huffington Post, which was later acquired by BuzzFeed. She was a popular conservative commentator in the mid-1990s, after which, in the late 1990s, she offered liberal points of view in public, while remaining involved in business endeavors. In 2003, she ran as an independent candidate for governor in the California recall election and lost. In 2009, Huffington was No. 12 in Forbes first-ever list of the Most Influential Women In Media. She has also moved up to No. 42 in The Guardian's Top 100 in Media List. As of 2014, she was listed by Forbes as the 52nd Most Powerful Woman in the World. She had moved to 77th as of 2018 and dropped off the list as of 2019.

In 2011, AOL acquired The Huffington Post for US$315 million and made Huffington the president and editor-in-chief of The Huffington Post Media Group, which included The Huffington Post and then-existing AOL properties including AOL Music, Engadget, Patch Media, and StyleList.

She stepped down from her role at The Huffington Post in August 2016 to focus on a new start-up, Thrive Global, a behavior-change technology company with the mission of improving productivity and health outcomes.

== Early life ==
Huffington was born Ariadnē-Anna Stasinopoúlou (Αριάδνη-Άννα Στασινοπούλου) in Athens, Greece, in 1950, the daughter of Konstantinos (a journalist and management consultant) and Elli (née Georgiadi) Stasinopoulou, and is the sister of Agapi (an author, speaker, and performer). She moved to the United Kingdom at the age of 16 and studied economics at Girton College, Cambridge, where she was the first foreign, and third female, president of the Cambridge Union. She studied abroad in India, and told IANS in an email interview "India has long held a special place in my heart, from the time I went to study comparative religion at Visva-Bharati University."

In 1971, Huffington appeared in an edition of Face the Music along with Bernard Levin. A relationship developed, of which she wrote, after his death: "He wasn't just the big love of my life, he was a mentor as a writer and a role model as a thinker." Huffington began writing books in the 1970s, with editorial help from Levin. The two traveled to music festivals around the world for the BBC. They spent summers patronizing three-star restaurants in France. At the age of 30, she remained deeply in love with him but longed to have children; Levin never wanted to marry or have children.

From March to April 1980, Huffington joined Bob Langley as the co-host of BBC1's late-night talk and entertainment show Saturday Night at the Mill, appearing in just five editions before being dropped from the programme.

== Career ==
In 1973, Arianna (as Stasinopoúlou) wrote a book titled The Female Woman, attacking the Women's Liberation movement in general and Germaine Greer's 1970 The Female Eunuch in particular. In the book she wrote, "Women's Lib claims that the achievement of total liberation would transform the lives of all women for the better; the truth is that it would transform only the lives of women with strong lesbian tendencies."

In the late 1980s, Huffington wrote several articles for National Review. In 1981, she wrote a biography of Maria Callas, Maria Callas – The Woman Behind the Legend, and in 1989, a biography of Pablo Picasso, Picasso: Creator and Destroyer.

Huffington rose to the national U.S. prominence during the unsuccessful Senate bid in 1994 by her then husband, Michael Huffington, a Republican. She became known as a reliable supporter of conservative causes such as Newt Gingrich's "Republican Revolution" and Bob Dole's 1996 candidacy for president. She teamed up with liberal comedian Al Franken as the conservative half of "Strange Bedfellows" during Comedy Central's coverage of the 1996 U.S. presidential election. For her work, she and the writing team of Politically Incorrect were nominated for a 1997 Emmy for Outstanding Writing for a Variety or Music Program.

As late as 1998, Huffington still aligned herself with the Republican Party. During that year, she did a weekly radio show in Los Angeles called Left, Right & Center, that "match[ed] her, the so-called 'right-winger', against self-described centrist policy wonk Matt Miller, and veteran 'leftist' journalist Robert Scheer." In an April 1998 profile in The New Yorker, Margaret Talbot wrote, "Most recently, she has cast herself as a kind of Republican Spice Girl – an endearingly ditzy right wing gal-about-town who is a guilty pleasure for people who know better." Huffington described herself by side-stepping the traditional party divide, saying "the right–left divisions are so outdated now. For me, the primary division is between people who are aware of what I call 'the two nations' (rich and poor), and those who are not."

Huffington, of Greek background, opposed the NATO intervention in Serbia during the Yugoslav Wars and in 2000, she co-convened the "Shadow Conventions", which appeared at the Republican National Convention in Philadelphia and the Democratic National Convention in Los Angeles at Patriotic Hall.

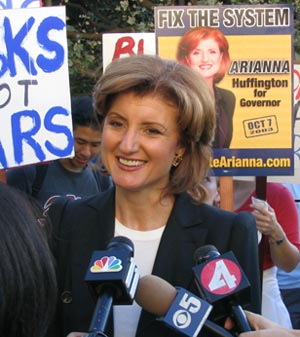
Campaigning for Governor of California, 2003

Huffington headed The Detroit Project, a public interest group lobbying automakers to start producing cars running on alternative fuels. The project's 2003 TV ads, which equated driving sport utility vehicles to funding terrorism, proved to be particularly controversial, with some stations refusing to run them.

In a 2004 appearance on The Daily Show with Jon Stewart, she announced her endorsement of John Kerry by saying, "When your house is burning down, you don't worry about the remodeling." Huffington was a panel speaker during the 2005 California Democratic Party State Convention, held in Los Angeles. She also spoke at the 2004 College Democrats of America Convention in Boston, which was held in conjunction with the 2004 Democratic National Convention. She was also a regular panelist on the nationally syndicated weekend radio program, Both Sides Now with Huffington & Matalin, hosted by Mark Green.

Huffington serves on the board of directors of the Berggruen Institute, the Center for Public Integrity, Uber, and Onex Corporation.

She is also a One Young World Counsellor, speaking to delegates at summits in Johannesburg, South Africa, in 2013 and Dublin, Ireland, in 2014. She spoke about her "third metric" for success and the value of youth leadership.

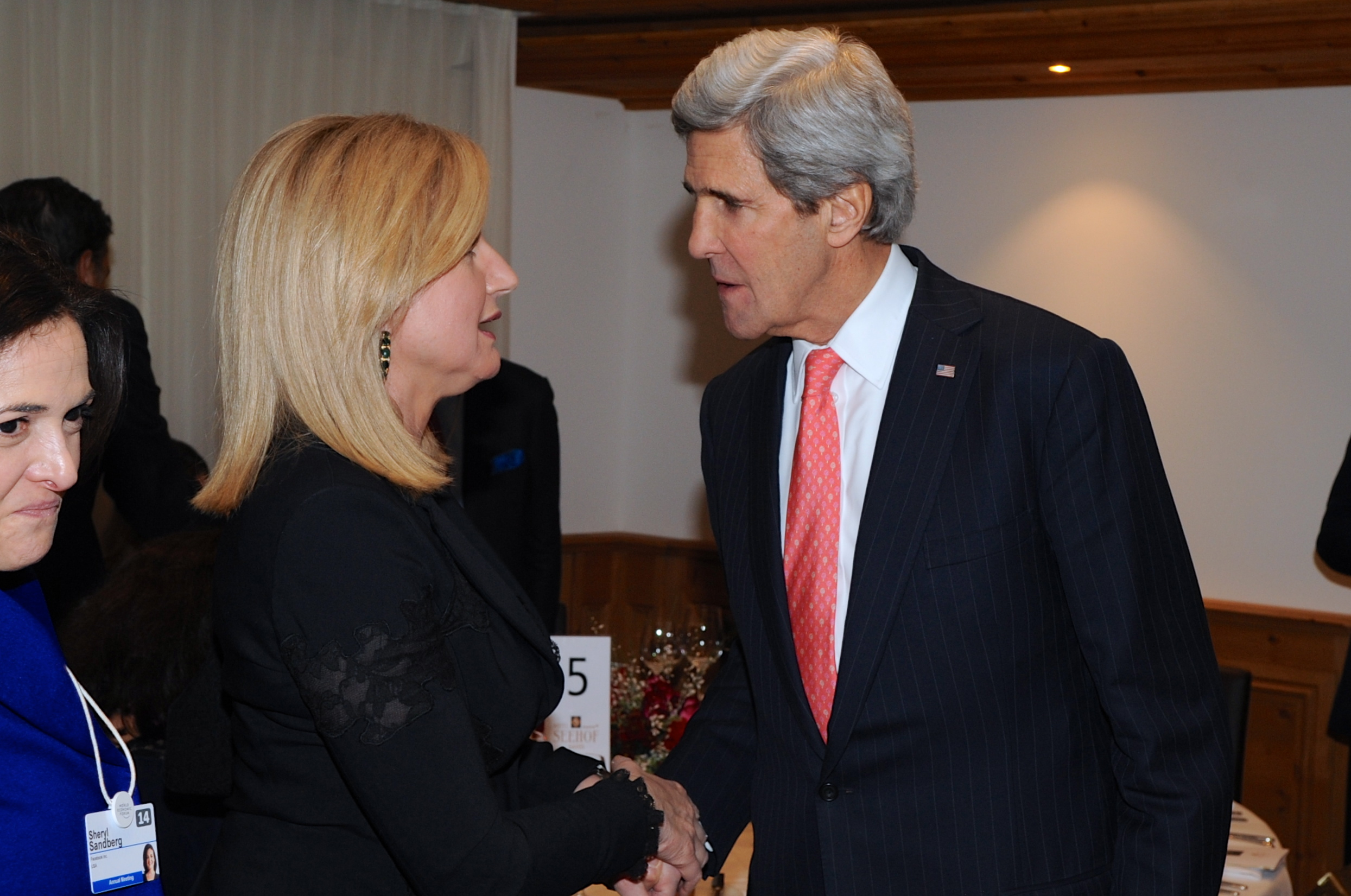
Huffington speaks with U.S. Secretary of State John Kerry during a dinner hosted by Coca-Cola CEO Muhtar Kent on the sidelines of the World Economic Forum in Davos in January 2014.

On May 22, 2016, she gave the commencement address and received an honorary degree from Colby College in Waterville, Maine. Also in 2016, she was named to Oprah Winfrey's SuperSoul100 list of visionaries and influential leaders.

Huffington has authored 15 books in her career. She faced 37 rejections before securing a publishing contract for her second book. Huffington also wrote the foreword for Marina Khidekel's book 'Your Time to Thrive,' published in 2021.

=== The Huffington Post ===
In 2005, Huffington founded The Huffington Post (now known as HuffPost) with Andrew Breitbart, Kenneth Lerer, and Jonah Peretti. It was launched on May 9, 2005, as a commentary outlet, blog, and an alternative to news aggregators such as the Drudge Report. The site historically published work from both paid staff writers and reporters and unpaid bloggers. In February 2011, AOL acquired The Huffington Post for US$315 million, making Huffington editor-in-chief of The Huffington Post Media Group. In 2012, The Huffington Post became the first commercially run United States digital media enterprise to win a Pulitzer Prize. In 2016, Huffington left The Huffington Post.

=== Thrive Global ===
In 2016 Huffington stepped down from her positions at AOL and Huffington Post to launch her new enterprise, Thrive Global, which claims to offer "science-based solutions" to end stress and burnout.

- Meditative Story Podcast – In August 2019, Thrive Global launched the podcast Meditative Story in partnership with WaitWhat – a media company led by former TED executives June Cohen and Deron Triff. The podcast supposedly combines first-person stories with meditation prompts and original music to create a "mindfulness experience" in audio. Variety has described it as "part first-person narrative podcast and part guided meditation." Forbes has described it as "a completely new kind of listening experience that blends intimate first-person stories with mindfulness prompts, enveloped in beautiful music composition." Huffington described Meditative Story as "a response to a deep cultural need in our hyper sped up world to have a moment to recharge. The podcast is a tool-set for wellness combining intimate storytelling, that we’re all hardwired to respond to, plus moments of reflection." The podcast's first season featured stories from Krista Tippett (host of the radio show On Being), NPR Host Peter Sagal, travel writer Pico Iyer, LinkedIn cofounder Reid Hoffman, Beautycon Media's Moj Mahdara, actor Josh Radnor, and astronomer Michelle Thaller, among others.
- Thrive Global Podcast – In 2017, Thrive Global launched a podcast with iHeart Radio featuring Huffington as host.

=== California recall election participation ===
Huffington was an independent candidate in the 2003 California gubernatorial recall election of California Governor Gray Davis. She described her candidacy against frontrunner Arnold Schwarzenegger as "the hybrid versus the Hummer", making reference to her ownership of a hybrid vehicle, the Toyota Prius, and Schwarzenegger's Hummer. The two would proceed to have a high-profile clash during the election's debate.

She dropped out of the race on September 30, 2003, and endorsed Governor Gray Davis' campaign to vote against the recall. Polls showed that only about 2 percent of California voters planned to vote for her at the time of her withdrawal. In the announcement of her withdrawal, Huffington stated,

"It has become clear to me that the only way to stop a Republican takeover of our state is to vote No on the recall. Because it's also clear that I am not going to win on October 7, I am withdrawing from the race so that I can devote all my time and energy in the remaining week to defeating the recall – and to defeating the Arnold Schwarzenegger-Pete Wilson forces that are trying to use the recall to hijack our state."

Though she failed to stop the recall, Huffington's name remained on the ballot and she placed 5th, capturing 47,505 votes – less than 1% of the vote.

=== Presence in media ===
Huffington was a panelist on the weekly BBC Radio 4 political discussion programme Any Questions?, and the BBC television panel games Call My Bluff and Face the Music. She served as co-host of BBC's late-night chat show Saturday Night at the Mill for four weeks before viewer complaints caused her to be dropped from the show. Huffington at one point was the co-host of the weekly, nationally syndicated public radio program Both Sides Now, along with Mary Matalin, former top aide to the George W. Bush administration. Every week on Both Sides Now, Huffington and Matalin discussed the nation's relevant political issues, offering both sides of every issue to listeners. Both Sides Now was hosted by former Air America Radio president and HuffPost blogger Mark Green.

Prior to The Huffington Post, Huffington hosted a website called AriannaOnline.com. Her first foray onto the internet was a website called Resignation.com, which called for the resignation of President Bill Clinton and was a rallying place for conservatives opposing Clinton. About Clinton resigning, she wrote, "Only some act of sacrifice can begin to restore the image of the President that we are left with from the Starr report – a man of staggering narcissism and self-indulgence, whom nobody dared gainsay, investing his energies first in gratifying his sexual greeds and then in using his staff, his friends, and the Secret Service to cover up the truth."

In November 2008, Huffington joined the cast of Seth MacFarlane's animated series The Cleveland Show, where she lent her voice to the wife of Tim the Bear, also named Arianna.

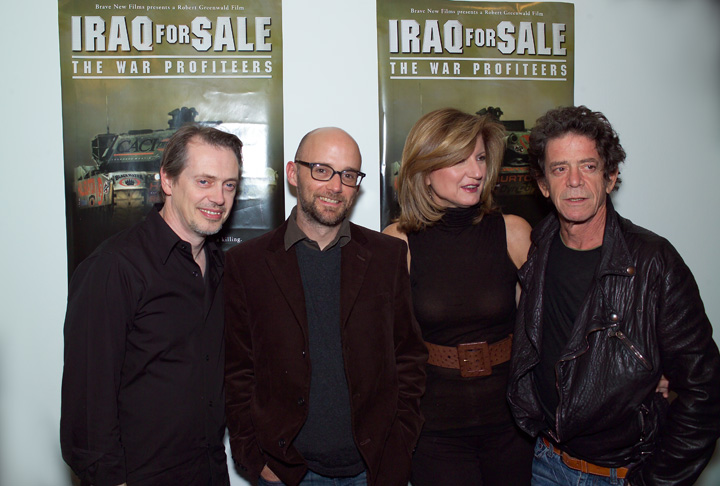
Huffington with Steve Buscemi, Moby and Lou Reed at a screening of the film Iraq for Sale: The War Profiteers, 2006

Huffington was spoofed by actress Tracey Ullman in her Showtime comedy series Tracey Ullman's State of the Union. Huffington spoke glowingly of the impersonation.

Huffington was further impersonated by actresses Michaela Watkins and Nasim Pedrad on Saturday Night Live.

She appeared as herself in the May 10, 2010, episode of the CBS sitcom How I Met Your Mother.

Huffington participated in the 24th annual "Distinguished Speaker Series" at the University at Buffalo, New York, on September 16, 2010. She headlined a debate against radio co-host Mary Matalin on current world events, political issues, and the local Buffalo economy. The University at Buffalo "Distinguished Speaker Series" has featured a multitude of world-renowned politicians and celebrities such as Tony Blair, Bill Nye, Jon Stewart, and the Dalai Lama.

Huffington offered to provide as many buses as necessary to transport those who wanted to go to Jon Stewart's Rally to Restore Sanity and/or Fear on October 30, 2010, from The Huffington Post headquarters in New York City. Ultimately, she paid for 150 buses to ferry almost 10,000 people from Citi Field in Queens to RFK Stadium in DC.

Huffington played herself in the Family Guy episode "Brian Writes a Bestseller" along with Dana Gould and Bill Maher in a live segment of Real Time with Bill Maher.

In 2012, Huffington became a LinkedIn influencer, writing about success and sharing professional insights.

== Claims of plagiarism ==
Huffington was accused of plagiarism for copying material for her book Maria Callas (1981); the claims were settled out of court in 1981, with Callas' biographer Gerald Fitzgerald being paid "in the low five figures."

== Religious views ==
Huffington has had a lifelong interest in spirituality; in her youth, together with Bernard Levin, she explored the Rajneesh movement, later dating Erhard Seminars Training founder Werner Erhard and going on to become affiliated with John-Roger Hinkins' Movement of Spiritual Inner Awareness. In 1994, she published a self-help book titled The Fourth Instinct, outlining her view that people should rise above the three basic instincts of survival, power, and sex to find their higher and better selves.

== Awards and honors ==
Huffington was named to the 2011 Time 100 as a media mogul. Huffington was selected for the inaugural 2021 Forbes 50 Over 50; made up of entrepreneurs, leaders, scientists and creators who are over the age of 50.

== Personal life ==
Huffington is Greek by birth and became a naturalized American citizen in 1990. She met her husband Michael Huffington in 1985. They were married a year later, on April 12, 1986, and have two daughters.

The couple later moved to Santa Barbara, California, and, in 1992, Michael ran as a Republican for a seat in the U.S. House of Representatives, winning the election by a significant margin. In 1994, he narrowly lost the race for the U.S. Senate seat in California to incumbent Dianne Feinstein.

The couple divorced in 1997. In 1998, Michael Huffington shared that he was bisexual, saying, "I know now that my sexuality is part of who I am, I've been through a long process of finding out the truth about me." He stated, "In December 1985, in my Houston townhouse I sat down with [Arianna] and told her that I had dated women and men so that she would be aware of it... The good news was that it was not an issue for her."

Huffington has residences in New York City, with her sister, Agapi Stassinopoulos, and the Brentwood neighborhood of Los Angeles.

== Bibliography ==
- The Female Woman (1973) ISBN 0-7067-0098-8
- The Other Revolution (1978) ISBN 9780718117207
- After Reason (1978) ISBN 0-8128-2465-2
- Maria Callas: The Woman Behind the Legend (1981) ISBN 0-8154-1228-2
- The Gods of Greece (1993) ISBN 0-87113-554-X
- The Fourth Instinct: The Call of the Soul (1994) ISBN 0-7432-6163-1
- Picasso: Creator and Destroyer (1996) ISBN 0-671-45446-3
- Greetings from the Lincoln Bedroom (1998) ISBN 0-517-39699-8
- How to Overthrow the Government (2000) ISBN 0-06-098831-2
- Pigs at the Trough: How Corporate Greed and Political Corruption Are Undermining America (2003) ISBN 1-4000-4771-4
- Fanatics & Fools: The Game Plan for Winning Back America (2004) ISBN 1-4013-5213-8
- Ephron, Nora & Huffington, Arianna. Narrated by Gail Saltz. Advice for Women at the 92nd Street Y. (2006)
- On Becoming Fearless...In Love, Work, and Life (2007) ISBN 978-0-316-16682-9
- Right is Wrong: How the Lunatic Fringe Hijacked America, Shredded the Constitution, and Made Us All Less Safe (2008) ISBN 978-0-307-26966-9
- Cooper, Marc, Donohue, Andrew, Huffington, Arianna, & Waxman, Sharon. Narrated by James Rainey. Media: Where Do We Go From Here? (2009)
- Third World America: How Our Politicians Are Abandoning the Middle Class and Betraying the American Dream (2010) ISBN 978-0-307-71982-9
- Thrive: The Third Metric to Redefining Success and Creating a Life of Well-Being, Wisdom, and Wonder (2014) ISBN 978-0-804-14084-3
- The Sleep Revolution: Transforming Your Life, One Night at a Time (2016) ISBN 978-1-101-90400-8
- Goodnight Smartphone (2017)
