= Cognitive complexity =

Concept in psychology

Cognitive complexity describes cognition along a simplicity-complexity axis. It is the subject of academic study in fields including personal construct psychology, organisational theory and human–computer interaction.

== History ==
First proposed by James Bieri in 1955 with Cognitive complexity-simplicity and predictive behavior which was published that year in The Journal of Abnormal and Social Psychology. In the article, he tests two hypotheses:

- There should be a positive relationship between degree of cognitive complexity and predictive accuracy.
- There should be a negative relationship between cognitive complexity and assimilative projection.

== In artificial intelligence ==
In an attempt to explain how humans perceive relevance, cognitive complexity is defined as an extension of the notion of Kolmogorov complexity. It amounts to the length of the shortest description available to the observer. For example, individuating a particular Inuk woman among one hundred people is simpler in a village in Congo than it is in an Inuit village.

Cognitive complexity is related to probability (see Simplicity theory): situations are cognitively improbable if they are simpler to describe than to generate. Human individuals attach two complexity values to events:

- description complexity (see above definition)
- generation complexity: the size of the minimum set of parameter values that the 'world' (as imagined by the observer) needs to generate the event.

To 'generate' an event such as an encounter with an Inuk woman in Congo, one must add up the complexity of each event in the causal chain that brought her there. The significant gap between both complexities (hard to produce, easy to describe) makes the encounter improbable and thus narratable.

== In computer science ==
In human–computer interaction, cognitive (or psychological) complexity distinguishes human factors (related to psychology and human cognition) from, for example, computational complexity.

== In psychology ==
Cognitive complexity is a psychological characteristic or psychological variable that indicates how complex or simple is the frame and perceptual skill of a person.

A person who is measured high on cognitive complexity tends to perceive nuances and subtle differences while a person with a lower measure, indicating a less complex cognitive structure for the task or activity, does not.

an aspect of a person's cognitive functioning which at one end is defined by the use of many constructs with many relationships to one another (complexity) and at the other end by the use of few constructs with limited relationships to one another (simplicity)

— Lawrence Pervin, Personality

It is used as part of one of the several variations of the viable non-empirical evaluation model GOMS (goals, operators, methods, and selection rules); in particular the GOMS/CCT methodology.

Cognitive complexity can have various meanings:

- the number of mental structures we use, how abstract they are, and how elaborately they interact to shape our perceptions.
- "an individual-difference variable associated with a broad range of communication skills and related abilities ... [which] indexes the degree of differentiation, articulation, and integration within a cognitive system".

== Related terms ==
Related to cognitive complexity is the term behavioral complexity, used by some researchers in organizational studies, organizational culture and management.

== See also ==
- Cognitive dimensions of notations
- Cognitive ergonomics
- Consciousness
- General semantics
- Language of thought
- Learning theory (education)
- Simplicity theory
- Social complexity
