= Sarah Kay (poet) =

American poet

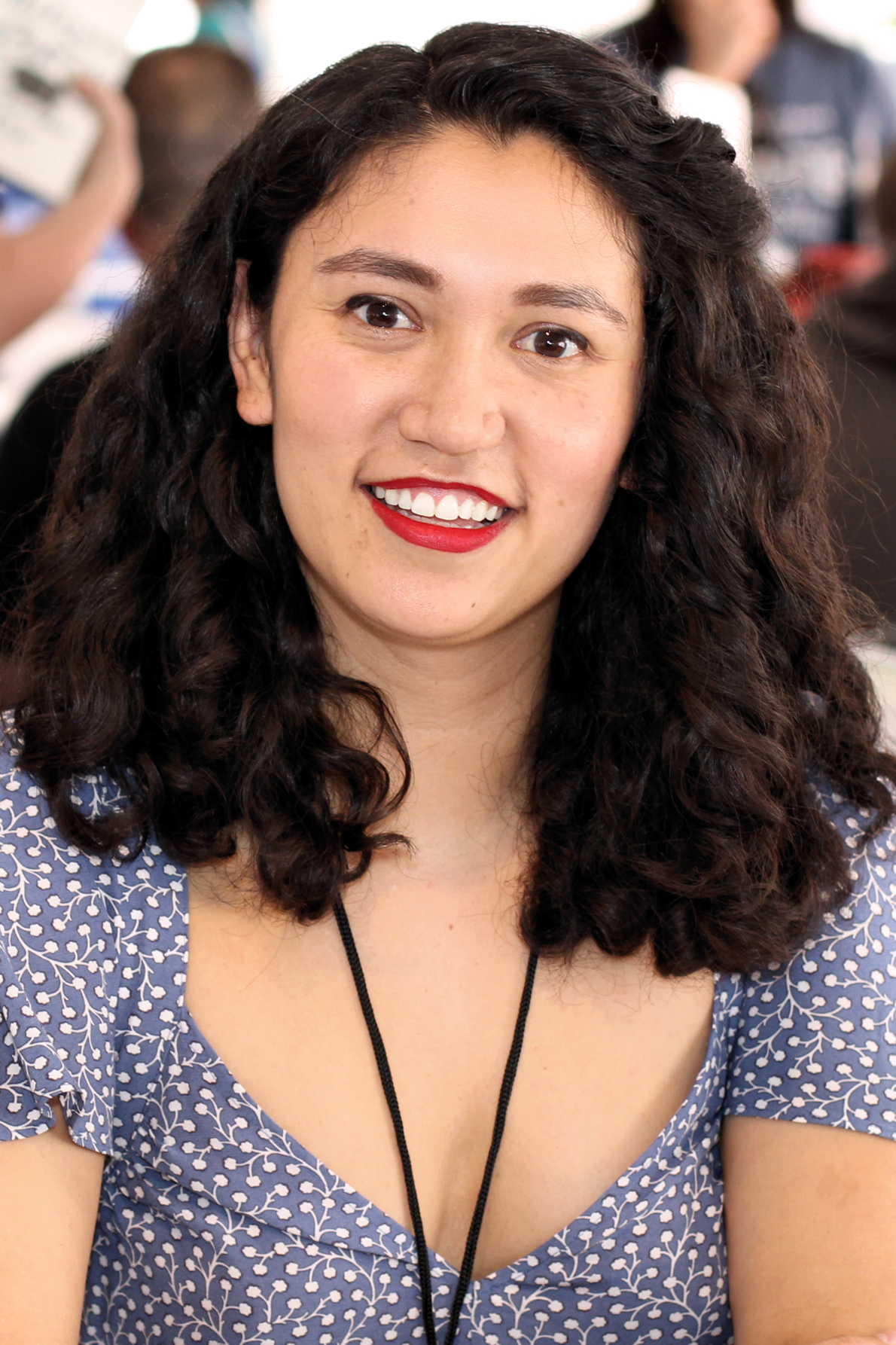
- Kay at the 2018 Texas Book Festival
- Born: June 19, 1988 (age 38); New York City, U.S.
- Education: Brown University (MA)
- Occupation: Poet
- Website: kaysarahsera.com

Sarah Kay (born June 19, 1988) is an American poet. Known for her spoken word poetry, Kay is the founder of Project V.O.I.C.E. (founded 2004), a group dedicated to using spoken word as an educational and inspirational tool.

== Life ==
And no matter how many land mines erupt in a minute, be sure your mind lands on the beauty of this funny place called life.

— Sarah Kay, If I Should Have a Daughter

Kay was born in New York City, New York, to a Japanese American mother and a Jewish American father. Sarah Kay has one brother, Philip Kay, who is four years younger. Sarah's dad worked during the day, so her mom was the one at home that she had to talk to. She has a Master of Arts in teaching from Brown University, and an honorary doctorate in humane letters from Grinnell College. She now currently writes, reads, and performs poetry for diverse audiences. She is also the co-director and founder of her current project, project VOICE. She began performing poetry at the Bowery Poetry Club in the East Village at the age of 14, joining their Slam Team in 2006. That year, she was the youngest person competing in the National Poetry Slam in Austin, Texas. She has participated in many poetry slams. In 2007 Kay made her television debut, performing the poem "Hands" on HBO's Def Poetry Jam. She has performed at events and venues like the Lincoln Center, the Tribeca Film Festival, and at the United Nations where she was a featured performer for the launch of the 2004 World Youth Report. In May 2010, she performed at *spark!, a benefit for the Acumen Fund in New York, New York.

On March 3, 2011, she performed at the TED conference in Long Beach, California as part of a series entitled "Beauty, Imagination, Enchantment." Along with a talk about her upbringing, she performed the poems "B: If I should have a daughter..." and "Hiroshima".

Kay performed at The Nantucket Project, a festival of ideas in Nantucket, Massachusetts.

She is the 2017 Artist in Residence at Grace Cathedral in San Francisco, California.

In 2019 she announced via Twitter that she would be hosting a podcast called Sincerely, X, which will be produced by TEDTalks and Audible.

== Publications ==
Although Kay works primarily in spoken word poetry, she has published poems in magazines such as Foundling Review, DamselFly Press, and decomP literary magazine.

In 2011, Kay published "B", a short hardcover book containing the titular poem, which was originally written in 2007. The book features illustrations by Sophia Janowitz. In March 2014, No Matter the Wreckage, a collection of poetry from the first decade of her career, was published by Write Bloody Publishing, again featuring illustrations by Sophia Janowitz. "The Type" was published in 2016 and is an illustrated version of her poem by the same name (with drawings by Sophia Janowitz as in her book "B") . Kay is also a resident poet for The Paris Review where she contributes in a weekly poetry column titled “Poetry Rx.” On March 13, 2018, All Our Wild Wonder, a vibrant tribute to extraordinary educators and celebrating learning, was released. The book features illustrations by Sophia Janowitz. Her second poetry collection A Little Daylight Left will be published by Penguin Random House on April 1, 2025. It is, in Kay's words "[...] a collection of poems that chronicles the evolution of my reaching. [...] of a lifelong grappling with what poetry is for, what it can & cannot do, how it buoys & connects & changes & ushers me through the chapters of my time here, not only as a compass, it turns out, but as a companion, too. [...]"

== Bibliography ==
- B (2011)
- No Matter the Wreckage: Poems (2014)
- The Type (2016)
- All Our Wild Wonder (2018)
- A Little Daylight Left (2025)
