= The Detroit Project =

The Detroit Project was a group of people that lobbied American automakers to build cars and SUVs that have higher fuel efficiency and use alternative fuels. The group also lobbied politicians to take action to reduce the petroleum dependence of the United States.

== Founders ==
- Lawrence Bender
- Laurie David
- Ari Emanuel
- Arianna Huffington

== See also ==
- A Band Apart
- Participant Productions
