= Jean-Louis Dessalles =

French computer scientist

- Born: 1 January 1956 (age 70); Périgueux, Dordogne, France
- Education: Télécom ParisTech
- Known for: Simplicity theory Kolmogorov complexity
- Scientific career
- Fields: Computer science

Jean-Louis Dessalles (born in 1956 in Périgueux) is a French computer scientist and researcher in artificial intelligence and cognitive science, professor à Télécom Paris (Paris). He is best known for his contributions to the Simplicity theory and for his original theory about a possible political origin of language.

== Biography ==
Dessalles was born in Périgueux in Southwestern France. He graduated from École Polytechnique in 1979 (promotion X76) and from Télécom ParisTech in 1981.

He is currently Professor of Computer Science at Télécom Paris, which is part of the University of Paris-Saclay.

== Research ==
Jean-Louis Dessalles focuses on the quest for fundamental principles underlying the language faculty and its biological origins. His contribution to Simplicity theory was to show that complexity drop predicts narrative interest. He also designed a concise model of argumentative relevance. On the issue of human language evolutionary origins, he found that Costly signalling theory can explain how honest communication is possible among selfish agents.

== Publications ==
Books

- Des intelligences TRÈS artificielles, Paris: Odile Jacob. 2019. ISBN 978-2738147141
- Le Fil de la vie. La face immatérielle du vivant (avec Pierre-Henri Gouyon et Cédric Gaucherel). Paris: Odile Jacob. 2016. ISBN 978-2-7381-3395-3
- La pertinence et ses origines cognitives, Nouvelles théories. Paris: Hermes-sciences. ISBN 978-2746220874
- Why We Talk, The evolutionary origins of language. Oxford, UK: Oxford University Press. 2007. ISBN 978-0-19-927623-3
- Les origines de la culture : les origines du langage (avec Pascal Picq et B. Victorri). Paris: Le Pommier. 2006. ISBN 978-2-74651-210-8
- Aux origines du langage. Une histoire naturelle de la parole. Paris: Hermes-sciences. 2000. ISBN 978-2746201194
- L'ordinateur génétique. Paris: Hermes-sciences. 1996. ISBN 978-2866015381

Science papers

- 2020: Language: The missing selection pressure. Theoria et Historia Scientiarum, 17.
- 2015: From conceptual spaces to predicates. In F. Zenker & P. Gärdenfors (Eds.), Applications of conceptual spaces: The case for geometric knowledge representation, 17–31. Dordrecht: Springer.
- 2014: Optimal investment in social signals, Evolution 68(6), 1640–1650.
- 2014: Why talk?. In D. Dor, C. Knight & J. Lewis (Eds.), The social origins of language, 284–296. Oxford, UK: Oxford University Press.
- 2013: Algorithmic simplicity and relevance. In D. L. Dowe (Ed.), Algorithmic probability and friends - LNAI 7070, 119–130. Berlin, D: Springer Verlag.

Journal articles, radio, TV.

- 2015 : Le grand roman de l’Homme. Emmanuel Leconte et Franck Guérin, ARTE, 14 July 2015
- 2014: Comment nous optimisons nos signaux sociaux. La Recherche, 494, 56–59.
- 2011: Parler pour exister, Revue Sciences Humaines, 224, 45–47.
- 2011: Les origines du language. La Marche des Sciences, Aurélie Luneau. France Culture, 18 January 2011.
- 2002: Image et science: le language, Jean-Pierre Mirouze. France 5, 3 October 2002.
- 2002: L’homme animal politique, animal loquace. Continent Sciences, Stéphane Deligeorges. France Culture, 21 February 2002.
- 2001: L’origine politique du language, La Recherche, 341, 31–35.

== See also ==
- Kolmogorov complexity
- Simplicity theory
