= Sincerely, X =

Society and culture podcast

- Genre: Podcast — Society and Culture
- Language: English

Creative team
- Created by: Deron Triff

Cast and voices
- Hosted by: June Cohen (February 2017 – May 2019); Sarah Kay (May 2019 -)

Production
- Production: Deron Triff; Colin Campbell; Cloe Shasha; Kelly Stoetzel; Amy Eason; Barb Allen; Chris Anderson; Eric Nuzum; Ryan and Hays Holladay

Publication
- Original release: February 1, 2017

Related
- Website: www.ted.com/podcasts/sincerely-x

Sincerely, X is a podcast featuring anonymous TED Talks, created as a co-production between TED and Audible. The anonymous speakers included a doctor who believed she killed a patient; a Silicon Valley executive who experienced a mental breakdown; a yoga instructor who unleashed pepper spray in a department store; and a woman in a violent marriage who invented a ritual that she believes saved her life. The series was hosted by June Cohen in season 1, and Sarah Kay hosts season two. It was created by Deron Triff, and executive produced by Deron Triff and Colin Campbell.

== History ==
The idea of a series featuring anonymous TED Talks was first proposed by TED's head of content distribution Deron Triff. The concept was that some stories are too sensitive, painful or potentially damaging to share publicly—unless they could be shared anonymously. TED solicited ideas for the anonymous talks through an open call for submissions. In an August 2017 interview, Triff told Fast Company "Many of the ideas we're seeing are based on personal experience, from people with vulnerability at home or in the workplace. They want to share their idea because it changed their lives, but they wouldn't want a public association with what happened. So it's a very different kind of story—it's very intimate."

The collaboration was led for Audible by then Head of Original Content Eric Nuzum. Production of the series was completed through a collaboration between TED, Audible and WaitWhat, the media company founded by Triff and Cohen.

The first episode aired on Audible on February 1, 2017, and became available publicly on iTunes on July 19, 2017.

In April 2019, Sarah Kay announced via Twitter that she would be the new host of the podcast.

== Format ==
Each episode of Sincerely, X features a talk, given anonymously in the privacy of a recording studio, and heard for the first time on the series. After each talk, the speaker is interviewed by host June Cohen. According to the show's introduction, the speakers' voices may be altered.

== Episodes ==
Season 1
| Ep. # | Title | Description | Air Date |
|---|---|---|---|
| 1 | "Dr. Burnout" | A doctor who believes she killed a patient offers insight into the ultimate cause: professional burnout. | July 19, 2017 |
| 2 | "Pepper Spray" | A yoga instructor who attacked other customers at a department store offers a window into the lived experience of those who lash out when overwhelmed. | July 27, 2017 |
| 3 | "Ex-Con" | A white collar criminal with a surprising perspective: Prison is effective. But inmates need help getting back on track when they're released. | August 3, 2017 |
| 4 | "Sad in Silicon Valley" | A successful Silicon Valley CEO suffers a mental breakdown after getting everything he wanted. He makes the case for modernizing mental health care and removing the stigma we associate it with. | August 10, 2017 |
| 5 | "Equality Executive" | Why does corporate America still have so few women executives? A rare insight from the inside the C-Suite. | August 17, 2017 |
| 6 | "Rescued by Ritual" | A self-described "Midwestern Mom" finds a way to heal the trauma of a violent marriage on her own. Her doctor urges her to share the ritual she created, as it might help others. | August 24, 2017 |
| 7 | "Mood Changer" | Years of depression. Scores of medications. An original approach to living with mental health, from the bottom up. | August 31, 2017 |
| 8 | "Reclaiming Power" | A young woman who was sexually assaulted says that bringing her attacker to trial was the most important thing she did to reclaim her sense of power—even though she did not win the case. | September 7, 2017 |
| 9 | "Rural Woman" | A woman who loves the rural area she grew up in asks: How can companies in small towns reinvent themselves, to have a place for modern women? | September 14, 2017 |
| 10 | "Gifted Kid" | A teacher who grew up with poverty and trauma offers insight on how to identify the gifted kids in classrooms (even when they hide their own gifts). | September 21, 2017 |

== Credits ==
According to the show credits, the executive producers are Deron Triff and Collin Campbell. The production team includes Cloe Shasha and Kelly Stoetzel, with help from Amy Eason and Barb Allen. Creative leadership comes from Chris Anderson at TED and Eric Nuzum at Audible. Original music is composed by Ryan and Hays Holladay.

== Reception ==
Three weeks after it launched, Sincerely, X reached the number one spot on the iTunes charts. It has charted in iTunes in nine countries.

Reviews of the podcast emphasize the intimacy and sincerity of the storytelling, given the anonymous nature of the talks. USA Today named Sincerely, X one of the seven best new podcasts of 2017, writing: "How can you make TED Talks even more personal? Ironically, by letting speakers remain anonymous. This podcast ... shows that storytellers can secretly open up about their own provocative and potentially problematic tales. It gets listeners to talk about often-taboo topics, including stories about mental health issues and professional burnout.

In January 2018, The Today Show named Sincerely, X among the five best podcasts to listen to now. The selections were made by Jack Rico, host of the podcast, Highly Relevant. He described Sincerely, X as "a selection of heart-wrenching and compelling anonymous true stories."

The Financial Times notes that the series was developed natively for audio, and this is evident in the talks: "There is a measured intimacy in the telling of these stories that would appear drowned out on stage." The Financial Times also compares the sincerity of the anonymous talks to those given at the TED Conference: "Ultimately this podcast is distinguished by a seriousness that sometimes seems to elude speakers on the TED stage, for whom viral fame is so tantalizingly close at hand. 'My name will never go down in history and that's OK,' says the anonymous speaker at the beginning of "Rescued by Ritual"—a mother from the Midwest who will go on to talk about the two decades of domestic violence she lived through, and the ritual she developed to cope. Pause for a minute, and consider what it took for her to get here: rounds of telephone interviews, edits and invasive fact-checking of her story; the journey to TED's New York studio; time spent learning her script off by heart on the request of producers. And for what? Because she had struck on a coping mechanism that she thought might help some strangers listening. Now that's an idea worth spreading."

== Awards ==
Sincerely, X received a 2018 Gracie Award for the episode "Rescued by Ritual"
