= David Halpern (psychologist) =

British psychologist

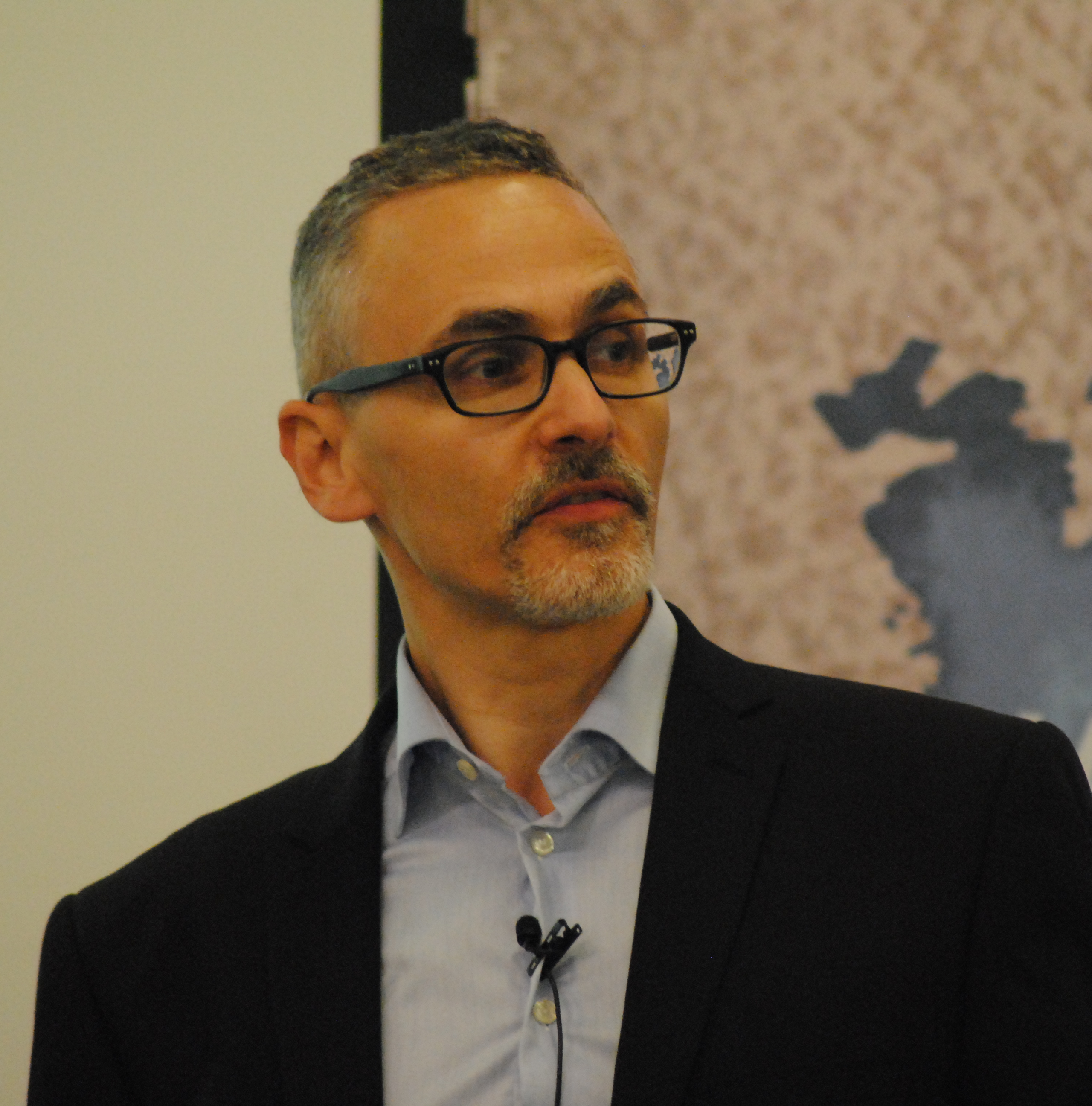
Halpern at Chatham House in June 2014

David Solomon Halpern CBE FAcSS (born June 1966) is a British psychologist and civil servant, who founded the Behavioural Insights Team (unofficially known as the Nudge Unit). The Behavioural Insights Team is an organisation spun out of the UK Cabinet Office, which applies a deep understanding of human behaviour and evidence-led problem solving to improve government, public policy and public services.

== Education ==
Halpern attended King's School, Rochester, before attending Christ's College, University of Cambridge achieving a 1st in natural sciences specialising in experimental psychology. He then went on to complete a PhD in social and political sciences, also at St John's College, Cambridge.

== Career ==
Halpern was a research fellow at the Policy Studies Institute (1991–94), a Nuffield College, Oxford prize research fellow (1993–96) and a lecturer in social human sciences at the University of Cambridge (1996–2001).

From 2001 to 2007, Halpern was chief analyst in the Prime Minister's Strategy Unit. He was then director of the Institute for Government from 2008 to 2010, where he remains a senior fellow.

Between 2010 and 2022, Halpern was CEO of the Behavioural Insights Team. As of 2024, he supports BIT as President Emeritus.

He is a visiting professor at King's College London.

Halpern is one of the 56 individuals named by the UK government as contributing to the Scientific Advisory Group for Emergencies in response to the COVID-19 pandemic in the United Kingdom, focusing on behavioural changes such as increased handwashing. On 11 March 2020 he gave an interview to the BBC on the importance of shielding vulnerable people during the COVID-19 pandemic until herd immunity had been achieved.

In a July 2023 interview with The Daily Telegraph, he proposed that through his unit's measures the public were now well "drilled" for future emergencies, going on to suggest that using fear was a useful tool "if you think people are wrongly calibrated".

With the launch of the Downing Battcock Institute at the University of Cambridge in October 2025, Halpern was appointed as the first Director.

In April 2026, he joined the Board of the Competition and Markets Authority as non-executive director.

== Honours ==
In 2016, Halpern was elected a Fellow of the Academy of Social Sciences (FAcSS).

He was appointed Commander of the Order of the British Empire (CBE) in the 2023 New Year Honours for public service.

== Selected works ==
He has authored or co-authored four books as well as a number of reports:

- Social Capital (2005).
- Options for Britain (1996 and 2010).
- The Hidden Wealth of Nations (2010).
- Inside the Nudge Unit (2015)
- The MINDSPACE report (Influencing behaviour through public policy), co-author.
