= Morten H. Christiansen =

Danish neurolinguist and cognitive scientist

Morten H. Christiansen (born 1963) is a Danish cognitive scientist known for his work on the evolution of language, and connectionist modeling of human language acquisition. He is the William R. Kenan Jr. Professor in the Department of Psychology and Director of the Cognitive Science of Language Lab at Cornell University as well Senior Scientist at the Haskins Labs and Professor in the School of Communication and Culture at Aarhus University. He finished a PhD at the University of Edinburgh in 1995.

His research has produced evidence for considering language to be a cultural system that is shaped by general-purpose cognitive and learning mechanisms, rather than from innate language-specific mental structures.

== Honors and memberships ==
In 2021, he became a member of the Royal Danish Academy of Sciences and Letters. In 2022, he became a foreign member of the Royal Norwegian Society of Sciences and Letters.

In 2024, he was awarded the Distinguished Cognitive Scientist Award by UC Merced.

== Selected publications ==
- Christiansen, Morten H.; Chater, Nick (2022). The language game: how improvisation created language and changed the world. New York: Penguin Books. ISBN 978-1-5416-7498-1. OCLC 1250200719.
- Christiansen, M.H. & Chater, N. (2016). Creating language: Integrating evolution, acquisition, and processing. Cambridge, MA: MIT Press.
- Christiansen, M.H. & Chater, N. (2016). The Now-or-Never bottleneck: A fundamental constraint on language. Behavioral & Brain Sciences, 39, e62
- Richerson, P.J. & Christiansen, M.H. (Eds.) (2013).Cultural evolution: Society, technology, language and religion. Cambridge, MA: MIT Press.
- Christiansen, M.H. & Chater, N. (2008). Language as shaped by the brain. Behavioral & Brain Sciences, 31, 489–558.
- Christiansen, M.H., Collins, C. & Edelman, S. (Eds.) (2009). Language universals. New York: Oxford University Press.
- Christiansen, M.H. & Kirby, S. (Eds.) (2003). Language evolution. Oxford, U.K.: Oxford University Press.
- Christiansen, M.H. & Chater, N. (Eds.) (2001). Connectionist psycholinguistics. Westport, CT: Ablex.
