= Nick Chater =

English behavioural scientist and writer (born 1965)

Nick Chater FBA
- Born: Nicholas John Chater; 19 May 1965 (age 61)
- Education: Trinity College, Cambridge; University of Edinburgh
- Occupations: Behavioural scientist; cognitive scientist; university professor; writer; academic; editor
- Years active: 1998–present
- Known for: Simplicity theory
- Awards: Spearman Medal (1995); Rumelhart Prize (2023)

Nicholas John Chater FBA (born 8 May 1965) is an English professor of behavioural sciences at the Warwick Business School in London. He heads the organisation's behavioural science group, the largest of its kind in Europe. Chater's work focuses on rationality and language using a range of theoretical and experimental approaches.

== Biography ==
=== Early life and education ===
Nick Chater was born on 8 May 1965 and obtained a Master of Arts degree in experimental psychology at Trinity College, Cambridge in 1986, graduating with First-Class honours. He subsequently attained his doctorate degree in cognitive science and psychology from the Centre for Cognitive Science at the University of Edinburgh, in 1989.

=== Career ===
In 1989, Chater worked as a lecturer in psychology, first at University College London (UCL), then, from 1990 to 1994, at the University of Edinburgh. In 1994, he began lecturing in experimental psychology at the University of Oxford before being named Professor of Psychology at the University of Warwick in 1996. In 2005, Chater was also named Professor of Cognitive and Decision Sciences at UCL.

Chater's early work, with Mike Oaksford, developed the view that human reasoning can be understood to function as uncertain inference, wherein the normative standard for human performance is probability theory. With respect to this understanding, Chater and Oaksford developed models of the Wason selection task, syllogistic reasoning, and conditional reasoning in which Bayesian inference is argued to be a fundamental principle of cognition.

Chater's research has focused on identifying general principles of cognition, including the role of simplicity in cognitive processing. He has applied the mathematical theory of Kolmogorov complexity to problems in cognitive science, arguing for formal connections between Bayesian and simplicity-based explanations of perceptual organisation. Using this approach, Chater has developed models of categorisation with Emmanuel Pothos, and aspects of language acquisition with Anne Hsu. In collaboration with the mathematician Paul Vitányi, Chater has examined learning from positive evidence, addressing questions of inductive inference and language learnability.

In judgement and decision-making, Chater is known for the Decision by Sampling model of risky choice, developed with Neil Stewart and Gordon D. A. Brown. This work is based on the idea that human judgement is inherently comparative and lacks absolute internal scales for representing magnitudes. The model proposes that decisions are made by sampling values from the environment or memory and evaluating options by comparison. It accounts for many phenomena previously explained by prospect theory and predicts additional context effects.

Chater has also contributed to research on language acquisition, processing, and evolution, through collaborations with Morten H. Christiansen. This work examines constraints on language–brain coevolution and proposes that key properties of language structure and processing arise from general cognitive constraints, including a roughly serial attentional bottleneck.

During the Cameron–Clegg coalition, Chater was an advisor to the Behavioural Insights Team (often called 'the Nudge Unit'), a social engineering policy consultancy organisation.

Chater presents the massive open online course The Mind Is Flat, based on his 2018 publication of the same name, in which he describes the human mind as a "story-generating machine". He was scientist-in-residence on eight seasons of the BBC Radio 4 series The Human Zoo. Chater is also an advisor to the UK government's Behavioural Insights Team and a fellow of the Cognitive Science Society and the British Academy.

== Bibliography ==
Books
Year	Title	Publisher	ISBN	Pages	Notes
1998	Rational Models of Cognition	Oxford University Press	978-0-19-852415-1	543	Co-authored with Mike Oaksford
1998	Rationality in an Uncertain World: Essays on the Cognitive Science of Human Reasoning	Psychology Press	978-0-86377-534-5	348	Co-authored with Mike Oaksford
2007	Bayesian Rationality: The Probabilistic Approach to Human Reasoning	Oxford University Press	978-0-19-852449-6	340	Co-authored with Mike Oaksford
2010	Cognition and Conditionals: Probability and Logic in Human Thinking	Oxford University Press	978-0-19-923329-8	420	Co-authored with Mike Oaksford
2015	Empiricism and Language Learnability	Oxford University Press	978-0-19-873426-0	257	Co-authored with Alexander Simon Clark, John A. Goldsmith, and Amy Perfors
2016	Creating Language: Integrating Evolution, Acquisition, and Processing	MIT Press	978-0-262-33477-8	330	Co-authored with Morten H. Christiansen
2018	The Mind Is Flat: The Illusion of Mental Depth and the Improvised Mind	Penguin Books	978-0-241-20877-9	272	Winner of the Association of American Publishers' PROSE Award for Best Book in Clinical Psychology (2019)
2023	The Language Game: How Improvisation Created Language and Changed the World	Penguin Books	978-1-804-99100-8	368	Co-authored with Morten H. Christiansen
2026	It's on You: How Corporations and Behavioral Scientists Have Convinced Us That We're to Blame for Society's Deepest Problems	Basic Books	978-1-541-70011-6	345	Co-authored with George Loewenstein

=== Select essays ===
- Chater, Nick; Christiansen, Morten H. (January 2016). "The Now-or-Never bottleneck: A fundamental constraint on language". Behavioral and Brain Sciences. 39 e62. doi:10.1017/S0140525X1500031X. ISSN 0140-525X. PMID 25869618.
- ———; Oaksford, Mike; Hahn, Ulrike; Heit, Evan (November 2010). "Bayesian models of cognition". Wiley Interdisciplinary Reviews: Cognitive Science. 1 (6): 811–823. doi:10.1002/wcs.79. ISSN 1939-5078. PMID 26271779.
- ——— (April 1999). "The Search for Simplicity: A Fundamental Cognitive Principle?". The Quarterly Journal of Experimental Psychology Section A. 52 (2): 273–302. doi:10.1080/713755819. ISSN 0272-4987.

== Awards ==
- 1995: British Psychological Society's Spearman Medal, jointly awarded with Mike Oaksford
- 1997: British Psychological Society's Experimental Psychology Society Prize
- 2023: David E. Rumelhart Prize
