= Laurie David =

American screenwriter (born 1958)

- Born: Laurie Ellen Lennard; March 22, 1958 (age 68); Long Island, New York, U.S.
- Education: Ohio University
- Spouses: Larry David (m. 1993; div. 2007); Robert Thorpe (m. 2012)
- Children: 2, including Cazzie

Laurie Ellen David (née Lennard; born March 22, 1958) is an American environmental activist, producer, and writer. She produced the Academy Award–winning An Inconvenient Truth (2006) and partnered with Katie Couric to executive produce Fed Up (2014), a film about the causes of obesity in the United States. She serves as a trustee on the Natural Resources Defense Council and a member of the Advisory Board of the Children's Nature Institute and is a contributing blogger to The Huffington Post.

== Personal life ==
Laurie Ellen Lennard was born and raised in a middle class Jewish family on Long Island. She was married to Larry David from March 31, 1993, to July 13, 2007. They have two daughters.

In 2007, David retained nearly half of their net worth following their divorce. She married Robert Thorpe in 2012.

== Entertainment industry ==
Before working full-time on environmental and political issues, David worked in the entertainment industry. She began her career in New York City as a talent coordinator for Late Night with David Letterman. Four years later, she left to start her own management company, representing comedians and comedy writers.

David also produced several comedy specials for HBO, Showtime, MTV, and Fox Television. Upon moving to Los Angeles, she became vice president of comedy development for a division of Fox Broadcasting and developed sitcoms for 20th Century Fox Television. After leaving to raise her daughters, she was one of the producers of An Inconvenient Truth, which won an Academy Award.

== Activism ==
=== Climate change ===
Laurie David has worked publicly on projects aimed at stopping climate change. She founded the Stop Global Warming Virtual March with Robert F. Kennedy, Jr. and Senator John McCain. David has produced other projects to bring the issue of climate change into the mainstream popular culture, including the release of her first book, Stop Global Warming: The Solution Is You!, and the comedy special Earth to America!, which aired on TBS on November 20, 2005.

Aside from the Academy Award-winning documentary An Inconvenient Truth, David produced HBO's Too Hot Not to Handle (a documentary on the effects of climate change in the U.S.), which aired on April 22, 2006. She appeared in Big Ideas for a Small Planet, an environmentalist documentary series on the Sundance Channel.

In a 2006 interview with The Guardian, David admitted that owning two homes on opposite sides of the country and flying in a private jet several times per year is at odds with her message: "Yes, I take a private plane on holiday a couple of times a year, and I feel horribly guilty about it. I probably shouldn't do it. But the truth is, I'm not perfect. This is not about perfection. I don't expect anybody else to be perfect either. That's what hurts the environmental movement – holding people to a standard they cannot meet. That just pushes people away."

=== Campaigns ===
As a trustee of the Natural Resources Defense Council and a founding member of The Detroit Project, David has spearheaded numerous public education and action campaigns urging Congress and automakers to raise fuel efficiency standards and make higher mileage cars. In January 2004, the NRDC opened the David Family Environmental Action Center.

== Awards ==
In 2003, David was honored by the Riverkeeper organization. She also received the Los Angeles-based Children's Nature Institute's Leaf Award in 2003 for her commitment to the environmental education of young children.

In October 2006, Glamour featured David as one of its "Women of the Year". She received the Gracie Allen Award for Individual Achievement from American Women in Radio & Television and the NRDC's 2006 Forces for Nature award for her work against global warming.

David has received numerous other awards and honors, including the Producers Guild of America's Stanley Kramer Award and a Humanitas Prize Special Award. Her environmental work has been honored with the National Audubon Society's Rachel Carson Award in 2007, the Feminist Majority's Eleanor Roosevelt Award, and Bette Midler's Green Goddess Award in 2019.

== Books ==
David has written two cookbooks on healthy eating and the importance of family dinner. The Family Dinner was published in 2010, with recipes by Kirstin Uhrenholdt, a foreword by Harvey Karp, and an afterword by Jonathan Safran Foer. The book advocates a return to the domestic tradition of an evening meal (sometimes called supper) shared around the family table. The Family Cooks was published a few years later.

She co-wrote a book on climate for kids, The Down to Earth Guide to Global Warming. In 2021, she co-wrote Imagine It! A Handbook for a Happier Planet, published by Random House/Rodale.

== Bibliography ==
- David, Laurie (2006). Stop Global Warming: The Solution Is You!. Fulcrum. ISBN 978-1-55591-621-3.
