= Social and Behavioral Sciences Team =

Agency overview
- Formed: September 15, 2015
- Jurisdiction: Government of the United States of America
- Headquarters: 725 17th Street, Washington, D.C.
- Agency executives: Maya Shankar, Chair; Amira Choueiki, Executive Secretary
- Parent department: Executive Office of the President
- Parent agency: National Science and Technology Council
- Website: sbst.gov

The Social and Behavioral Sciences Team (SBST) was established in the US by Executive Order #13707 on September 15, 2015.

The Social and Behavioral Sciences Team was a group of experts in applied behavioral science that translated findings and methods from the social and behavioral sciences into improvements in federal policies and programs for the benefit of the American people. The SBST was chaired by the White House Office of Science and Technology Policy (OSTP) and represented a dozen member agencies across the Federal Government, as well as offices within the Executive Office of the President. SBST also received critical support from the General Services Administration. The Executive Order charged SBST with providing advice and policy guidance to Federal agencies in support of the order.

The team was chaired by Maya Shankar Ph.D. "The goal is to help people who want to take a given step but may face some barriers," commented Maya.

The SBST aimed to apply insights from social and behavioral science to policy. According to members of the team, they have helped connect veterans with employment and educational counseling benefits and helped struggling student borrowers understand their loan repayment options.

The team is no longer active as of January 21, 2017, with employees having left to other agencies or organizations. During the Trump administration, the team's work was continued by the General Services Administration's Office of Evaluation Sciences.
