= Todd Rogers (behavioral scientist) =

Harvard Professor, behavioral scientist and author

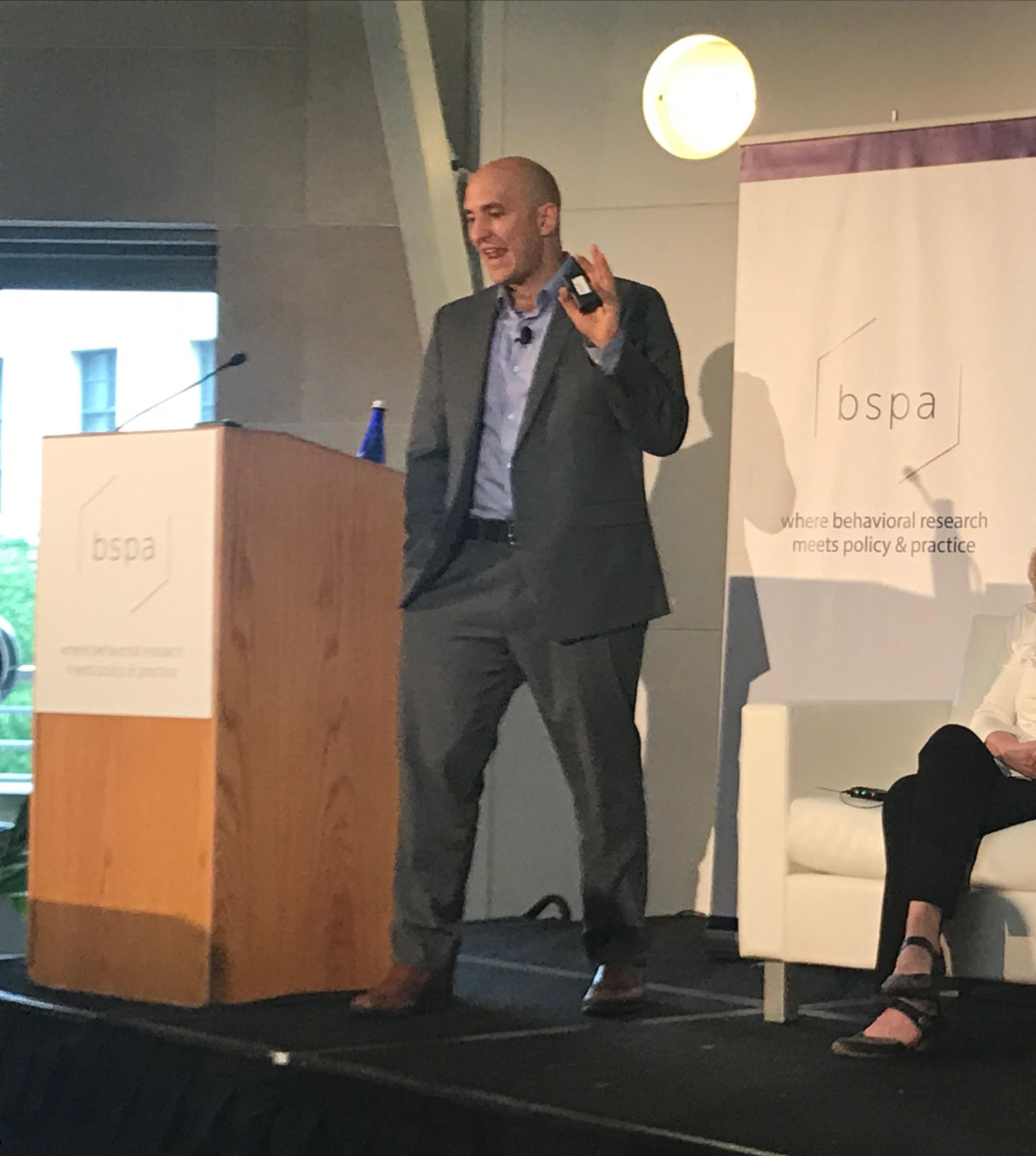
- Education: Williams College; Harvard University
- Scientific career
- Fields: Behavioral science
- Workplaces: Harvard Kennedy School
- Website: https://www.toddthings.com/

Todd Rogers is an American academic, behavioral scientist, entrepreneur and author. He is the Weatherhead Professor of Public policy at the Harvard Kennedy School. He is the co-founder of the Analyst Institute and EveryDay Labs (formerly InClass Today). At the Harvard Kennedy School, he is faculty director of the Behavioral Insights Group and the founding director of the Fandom and Social Connection Initiative at Harvard Kennedy School. He is also an academic advisor at the UK's Behavioral Insights Team and a Senior Researcher at ideas42.

== Early life and education ==
Rogers attended Williams College in Williamstown, Massachusetts, and graduated with a double major in Religion and Psychology. He went on to Harvard University where he received an M.A. in Social psychology in 2005. In 2008, he received a Ph.D. in Organizational behavior from Harvard Business School.

== Education research ==
Rogers's research applies behavioral science insights and methods to understand important social challenges and to develop interventions to mitigate them. His current research focuses on interventions to help people maintain and strengthen social connections, with a special focus on sports fandom as a vehicle for making friends

Rogers's academic work has been published in Science (journal), Proceedings of the National Academy of Sciences of the United States of America, American Economic Review, Psychological Science, Management Science (journal), and others. He is regularly cited in popular media including: The New York Times, The Washington Post, Time (magazine), Harvard Business Review, and others.

== Career ==
Rogers is the Director of the Social Connection and Sports Fandom Initiative at Harvard University. Rogers is the co-founder and chief scientist at EveryDay Labs, an organization which seeks to improve student outcomes through behavioral science interventions. EveryDay Labs is best known for scaling absence-reducing interventions proven to reduce the rate of chronic absenteeism by 10-15% in a K–12 setting.

Rogers was the founding executive director of the Analyst Institute. The organization's work in the political realm was covered in The New York Times Magazine, and was also discussed in-depth in Sasha Issenberg's book, The Victory Lab: The Secret Science of Winning Campaigns.

== Personal life ==
Rogers is a cancer survivor, he was diagnosed with non-Hodgkin lymphoma in high school. Raised in Philadelphia, he is a Philadelphia Eagles fan.

== Books ==
- Writing for Busy Readers: Communicate More Effectively in the Real World (Penguin Random House, 2025)

== Selected publications ==
Politics

- Fernbach, P.M., Rogers, T., Fox, C.R., & Sloman, S.A. (2013). Political Extremism is Supported by an Illusion of Understanding. Psychological Science, 24(6), 939–946.
- Gerber, A.S., & Rogers, T. (2009). Descriptive Social Norms and Motivation to Vote: Everybody's Voting and So Should You. The Journal of Politics, 71(1), 178–191.
- Nickerson, D.W.,& Rogers, T. (2010) Do You Have a Voting Plan?: Implementation Intentions, Voter Turnout, and Organic Plan Making. Psychological Science, 21(2), 194–199.

Education

- Bergman, P., Lasky-Fink, J., & Rogers, T. (2019). Simplification and defaults affect adoption and impact of technology, but decision makers do not realize it. Organizational Behavior and Human Decision Processes.
- Rogers, T. & Feller, A. (2018). Reducing Student Absences at Scale by Targeting Parents' Misbeliefs, Nature Human Behaviour, 2, 335–342.
- Rogers, T. & Feller, A. (2016) Discouraged by Peer Excellence: Exposure to Exemplary Peer Performance Causes Quitting. Psychological Science, 27(3), 365–374.
