= Maya Shankar =

Cognitive scientist

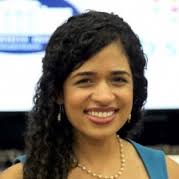

Senior Advisor at the White House Office of Science and Technology Policy
- In office April 2013 – January 19, 2017
- President: Barack Obama

Chair of Social and Behavioral Sciences Team
- In office September 2015 – January 19, 2017

First Behavioral Science Advisor to the United Nations
- In office January 2016 – October 2016
- President: Secretary-General of the United Nations Ban Ki-moon

Personal details
- Spouse: Jimmy Li
- Education: Yale University (BA); University of Oxford (DPhil)
- Website: mayashankar.com

Maya Shankar is a cognitive scientist and the host and executive producer of the podcast, A Slight Change of Plans.

== Career ==
=== Podcast: A Slight Change of Plans ===
A Slight Change of Plans was first published in 2021 by Pushkin Industries, the media company co-founded by Malcolm Gladwell and Jakob Weisberg.

A Slight Change of Plans explores what happens after a person experiences a life-changing event. It’s inspired by Shankar’s experience as a young classical violinist, training at Juilliard, whose career was cut short by an injury. “My whole childhood revolved around the violin, but that changed in a moment when I injured my hand playing a single note,” said Shankar. “I was forced to try and figure out who I was, and who I could be, without it.”

On the show, Shankar interviews people who have lived through different kinds of big changes — accidents, deaths, kidnappings — to understand how they navigated the waters ahead. The show emphasizes the universality of human psychology to help listeners feel less alone with their own choices. Shankar explains: “Cognitive science teaches us that the strategies we use to navigate those changes can be quite similar. Which is heartening to realize!”

A Slight Change of Plans was named the Apple Podcast of the Year in 2021. In 2023, it won the Ambie Award for Best Personal Growth Podcast. In 2022, Shankar earned a Webby nomination for Best Podcast Host.

=== Career in behavioral science ===
Shankar served as a senior advisor in the Obama White House, where she founded the White House Social and Behavioral Sciences Team, which was formalized by Executive Order 13707 in 2015. Her work at the White House was profiled by The New Yorker in 2017.

Shankar also served as the first Behavioral Science Advisor to the United Nations. She is a Director at Google.

=== Early career as a musician ===
Shankar is a graduate of the pre-college program at the Juilliard School, where she was a private violin student of Itzhak Perlman. When she was a teenager, she injured a tendon in her left hand, bringing her musical career to an end.

== Education ==
Shankar earned her B.A. from Yale University in cognitive science and went on to earn her Ph.D. from the University of Oxford on a Rhodes Scholarship. In 2013, Shankar completed her postdoctoral fellowship in cognitive neuroscience at Stanford University. She attended high school at the Juilliard School PreCollege program.

== Personal life ==
Maya Shankar's father is Ramamurti Shankar, Indian theoretical particle physicist and a professor at Yale University. In her Meditative Story, The Joy of Being An Unwilling Traveler Through Life, she describes her father's influence on her and the insights he shared to ease her lifelong anxiety.

Her mother is Uma Shankar, an International Scholar Adviser at Yale University. In a graduation speech Maya gave at The Juilliard School, she explains the role her mother played in her violin journey, and the lesson of "imaginative courage" her mom taught her.
