= Thrive Global =

American technology company

- Company type: Private
- Industry: Technology
- Founded: August 2016; 8 years ago
- Founder: Arianna Huffington
- Headquarters: New York, United States
- Website: thriveglobal.com

Thrive Global is an American company that provides behavior change technology. It was founded by Arianna Huffington in August 2016. The company is based in New York City.

In 2017, Thrive Global raised $30 million in a new funding round that valued the company at $120 million. The same year, the company was named one of the Top 10 NYC Startups to Watch in 2017 by Inc.

== History ==
Huffington says a 2007 incident in which “she collapsed at her desk from exhaustion and awoke in a pool of blood, with a broken cheekbone,” was the wake-up call that eventually led her to start Thrive Global. Huffington stepped down as editor-in-chief of The Huffington Post in August 2016 to fully focus on launching Thrive Global.

Before its official launch in November 2016, Thrive Global raised $7 million in a Series A funding round from investors such as Blue Pool Capital and Greycroft Partners. The company has also formed corporate partnerships with Accenture, Airbnb, Hilton Hotels & Resorts, JPMorgan Chase, and Uber.

In January 2017, reports emerged that six weeks after launching, Thrive had doubled its revenue targets for the year. In November 2017, the company secured $30 million in additional funding from investors such as Marc Benioff and the venture firm IVP. At the time, the company was valued at $120 million. Thrive Global investors also include Jack Ma, Kevin Durant, and Andre Iguodala.

Thrive Global launched operations in India in January 2018 in collaboration with Times Bridge, the international investments and partnerships division of Times Internet. A month later, the company launched Thrive Greece in partnership with Antenna Group, the largest media company in Greece.

In 2018, Thrive Global was named to LinkedIn's list of "The 50 most sought-after startups in the U.S." In 2021, Thrive Global was named to Forbes' list of "America's Best Startup Employers."

In July 2021, the company raised $80 million in a Series C round led by Kleiner Perkins and Owl Ventures. It claimed to be focused on ending the "stress and burnout epidemic".
