= Moj Mahdara =

Iranian-American entrepreneur

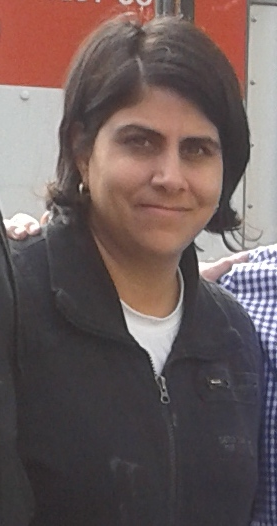
Mahdara in 2013

Moj Mahdara is an Iranian-American entrepreneur and investor. They are the co-founder and managing partner of Kinship Ventures, a venture capital firm launched with Gwyneth Paltrow.

Before launching Kinship Ventures, Mahdara was chief executive officer of Beautycon Media, a global festival and media company centered on beauty and popular culture.

Mahdara lives in Los Angeles with their spouse Roya Rastegar and their children.

== Early life ==
Mahdara is a first-generation Iranian-American

In her early career, Mahdara worked with Goldenvoice on sponsorship and brand partnerships related to the Coachella Valley Music and Arts Festival. Mahdara has said that experiences in music and art culture—including Coachella and artists such as Nine Inch Nails and Banksy—influenced her thinking about community-driven brands and contributed to the creation of Beautycon.

Mahdara has said that her paternal grandmother, Afat Mahdara (born Moluk Anghoz), was a singer in Iran in the 1960s. In interviews, Mahdara has described learning about her grandmother’s public musical career as an influence on her views about risk-taking and self-expression.

== Career ==
=== Beautycon Media ===
Beautycon began as a meetup event bringing together beauty enthusiasts and online creators. Prior to Mahdara becoming CEO and co-founder in 2015, Beautycon began as small gatherings of beauty creators held at YouTube’s Los Angeles studios.

Following this expansion, Beautycon expanded beyond its original events to include digital content, influencer marketing, and retail initiatives.

The New York Times described Beautycon as “the Super Bowl of the beauty industry,” while Women’s Wear Daily called it “a mecca for beauty fans.”

Beautycon released a research report titled FOMO Vol. 1 examining Generation Z consumer behavior.

In 2016, Fast Company named Mahdara to its “Most Creative People in Business” list, and The Hollywood Reporter listed them among its “Top 25 Most Powerful Digital Players.”

In 2016, Beautycon organized a "Creator Town Hall" in Los Angeles where Hillary Clinton met with YouTube creators.

== Recognition and affiliations ==
Mahdara is a Henry Crown Fellow at the Aspen Institute, an elite program that selects accomplished entrepreneurs and executives to engage in leadership development, ethics, and social impact while designing ventures for public good.

Mahdara has also participated in the Goldman Sachs Builders and Innovators Summit, an annual program that convenes entrepreneurs and business leaders.

Mahdara and their work with Beautycon have been covered in publications including The New York Times, The Wall Street Journal, Fast Company, and Forbes.

== Awards and nominations ==
Year	Issuer	Award
2016	Fast Company	The Most Creative People in Business 2016
2016	The Hollywood Reporter	LA's Most Powerful Digital Players
2018	Variety	Digital Executives to Watch
2019	Marie Claire	Marie Claire’s “50 Most Influential Women”
	Women’s Wear Daily	Digital Power Posse
