= Michelle Thaller =

American astronomer, scientist, and science communicator

Dr Michelle Thaller
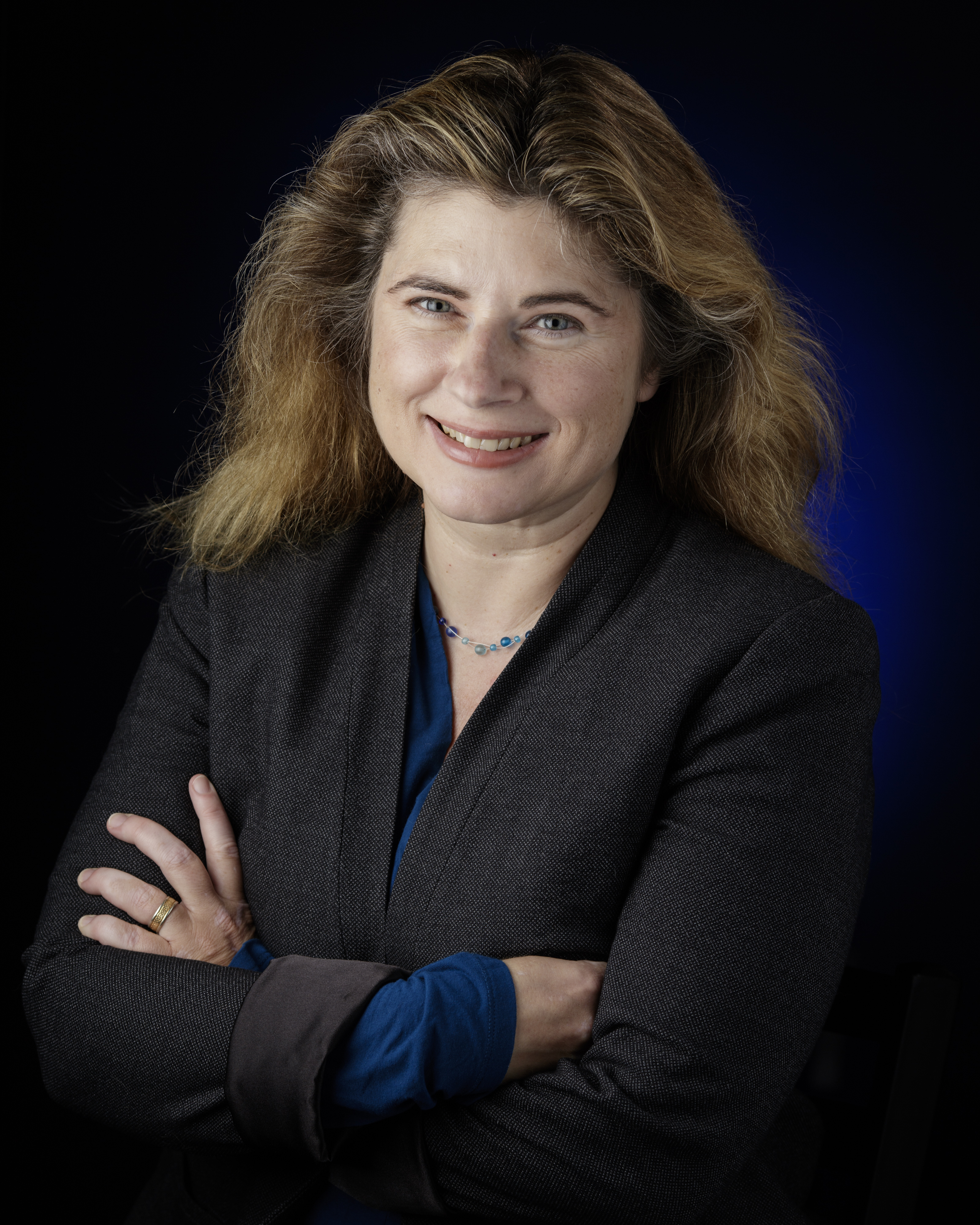
- Born: Waukesha, Wisconsin, U.S.
- Education: BS 1992, PhD 1998
- Alma mater: Harvard University; Georgia State University
- Spouse: Andrew Booth (2000–2020)

Michelle Thaller is an American astronomer, research scientist, and science communicator. Thaller is formerly the Assistant Director for Science Communication at NASA Goddard Space Flight Center. She retired in 2024 after 27 years at NASA.

From 1998 to 2009 she was a staff scientist at the Infrared Processing and Analysis Center, and later Manager of the Education and Public Outreach program for the Spitzer Space Telescope, at the California Institute of Technology. She is a frequent on-camera contributor to programming on the History Channel and Science Channel.

== Background ==
A native of Wisconsin, Thaller graduated from Waukesha South High School in 1988. She attended Harvard University, where she majored in astrophysics and worked on precision measurement of binary stars, receiving a bachelor's degree in 1992. At Georgia State University Thaller worked on colliding winds in close massive binary systems. She received a PhD in 1998.

Thaller is a regular contributor to the online edition of the Christian Science Monitor, for which she writes a monthly science column, and appears on the History Channel show, The Universe, and the Science Channel series How the Universe Works, Strip the Cosmos, and The Planets and Beyond. In 2016 and 2017 Thaller authored and hosted the PRX/Sky & Telescope Orbital Path Podcasts series, and in 2008 contributed to and appeared in the NASA Spitzer Space Telescope's award-winning video podcast series IRrelevant Astronomy.

== Personal life ==
Thaller married fellow astronomer Andrew Booth on September 8, 2000, in Scotland. Booth, a tenured professor at the University of Sydney, moved from Australia to be with Thaller in Pasadena, California, during her post-doctoral research fellowship at Caltech. He died in 2020 due to a rare form of brain cancer.
