= Craig Calhoun =

American sociologist (born 1952)

Craig Calhoun FBA FAcSS
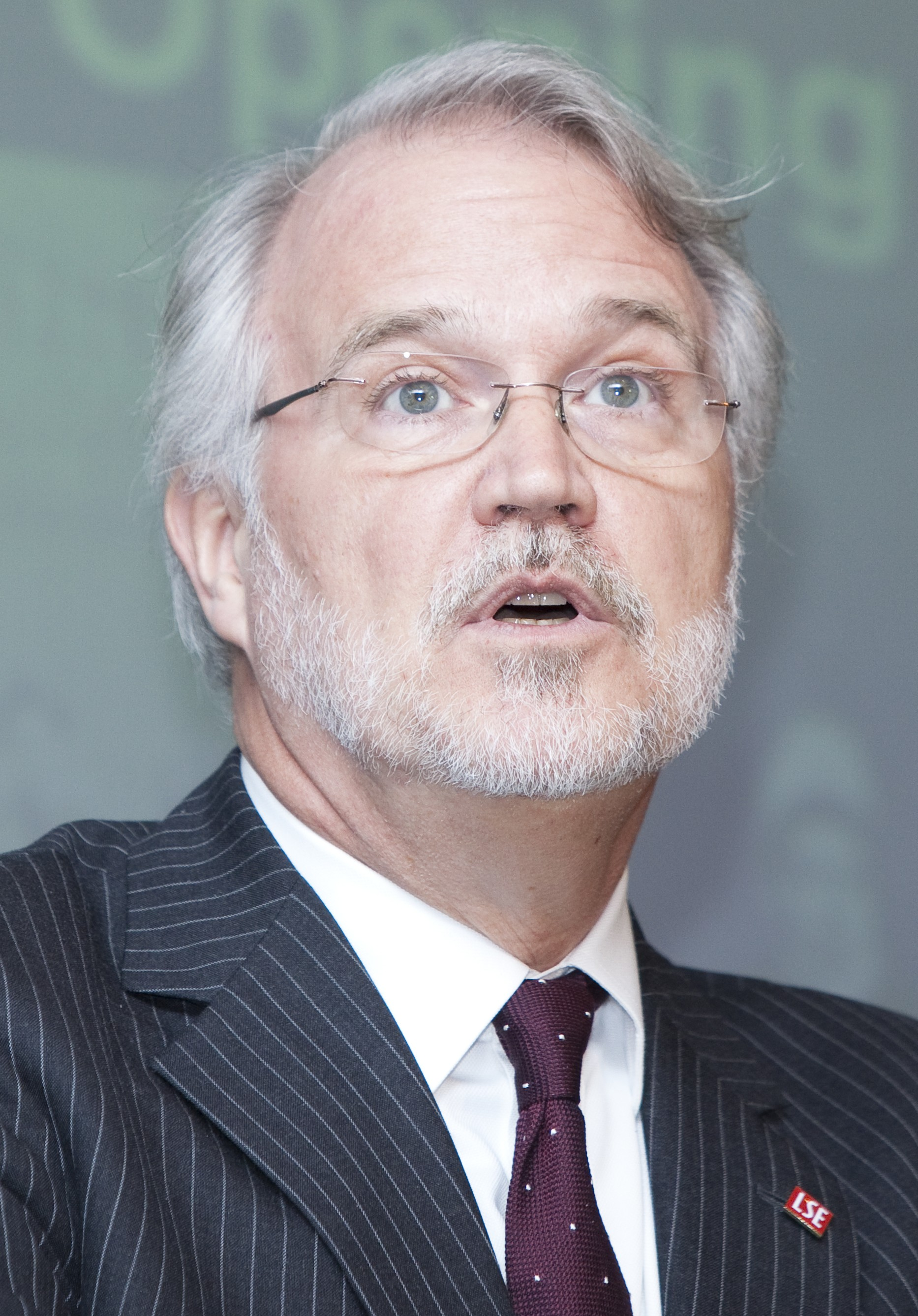
- Calhoun at the London School of Economics Library
- Born: Craig Jackson Calhoun; June 16, 1952 (age 74); Watseka, Illinois, US
- Known for: Public sociology, directing the London School of Economics, leadership of the Social Science Research Council and the Berggruen Institute
- Board member of: Berggruen Institute, Social Science Research Council, International Science Council
- Spouse: Pamela F. DeLargy
- Awards: Fellow of the British Academy; Fellow of the Academy of Social Sciences

Academic work
- Notable works: Degenerations of Democracy (2022), Neither Gods Nor Emperors: Students and the Struggle for Democracy in China (1994), The Roots of Radicalism (2012)

Academic background
- Education: University of Southern California (BA); Columbia University (MA); University of Manchester (MA); St Antony's College, Oxford (DPhil)
- Thesis: Community, Class and Collective Action (1980)
- Doctoral advisor: Ronald Max Hartwell

Academic work
- Discipline: Sociology
- Sub-discipline: Comparative historical sociology
- School or tradition: Critical theory
- Institutions: Columbia University; University of North Carolina at Chapel Hill; New York University; London School of Economics; Arizona State University
- Main interests: Social theory; social movements; social change
- Website: cjcalhoun.com

Craig Jackson Calhoun FBA FAcSS (born 1952) is an American sociologist and social theorist known for his work in critical social theory, public sociology, and the study of social change. His scholarship has focused on how social movements, democracy, nationalism, and the public sphere emerge from the interaction of local communities with larger social structures.

Calhoun's research is notably interdisciplinary and bridges anthropology, history, politics, religion, and economics in exploring questions of collective action and social development across diverse contexts (from historical case studies in 18th century Lisbon to contemporary projects in China and the Horn of Africa). He has been described as an intellectual who strives to embed academic knowledge in public life, reflecting a commitment to "ensure academia is not aloof from society, but embedded in it."

Calhoun is currently University Professor of social sciences at Arizona State University. He served as Director and President of the LSE from 2012 to 2016. In 2016, he became the first President of the Berggruen Institute. A role he served until 2018. A period in which he helped shape the institute's focus on global governance and philosophical policy questions. Earlier in his career he taught at the University of North Carolina Chapel Hill, Columbia University, and New York University, where he founded the Institute for Public Knowledge. Calhoun's contributions to social sciences have earned him wide recognition. For example, he was elected a Fellow of the British Academy in 2015 and is also a Fellow of the Academy of Social Sciences His work continues to influence discussions on how sociology can address pressing global issues and connect scholarly research with public debate.

== Early life and education ==
Calhoun was born on June 16, 1952, in Watseka, Illinois. He spent parts of his early life in rural Kentucky and Illinois, influenced by his father's role as a Protestant minister. This upbringing introduced him to diverse communities and fostered early interest in religion, ethics and social structures.

Calhoun pursued undergraduate studies in anthropology and cinema at the University of Southern California, earning a B.A. in 1972. He then obtained an M.A. in anthropology and sociology from Columbia University in 1974, followed by a second M.A. in social anthropology from the University of Manchester in 1975.

He received his D.Phil. in sociology and modern social and economic history from St Antony's College, University of Oxford in 1980. His doctoral thesis, titled "Community, Class and Collective Action," examined working-class radicalism in the 19th-century England. This laid the groundwork for his enduring interest in social movements and class politics. At Oxford, he studied under J.Clyde Mitchell, Angus MacIntyre, and Ronald Max Hartwell.

=== Academic tenures ===
Calhoun began his academic career at the University of North Carolina at Chapel Hill, where he taught from 1977 to 1996. There he also served as dean of the Graduate School and was the founding director of the University Center for International Studies. His tenure at UNC marked a start of his institutional leadership, where he prioritized interdisciplinary collaborations and the internationalization of social science research.

In 1996, he joined New York University (NYU) as Chair of the Department of Sociology. Calhoun played a leading role in rebuilding NYU's sociology program into a hub for urban and global social theory. After a brief period at Columbia University, he returned to NYU to become the founding director of the Institute for Public Knowledge (IPK), The IPK was established to promote dialogue between academics and practitioners and to foster public engagement with scholarly knowledge across disciplines.

With sociologist Richard Sennett, Calhoun co-founded NYLON, an interdisciplinary transatlantic seminar linking graduate students in New York City and London. The NYLON network created an innovative model for collaborative research. In particular in the fields of urban sociology, ethnography, and critical theory.

In 2012, Calhoun was appointed Director and President of the London School of Economics and Political Science (LSE), where he served until 2016. His tenure was marked by efforts to expand the global role of the university, strengthen social science funding, and enhance interdisciplinary research initiatives. Following his leadership at LSE, he was named Centennial Professor of Sociology at the institution.

=== International teaching and honors ===
In addition to his academic appointments in the United States and the United Kingdom, Calhoun has taught and lectured at universities across the globe. His visiting roles have included appointments at the Beijing Foreign Studies University, the Ecole des Hautes Etudes en Sciences Sociales (EHESS) in Paris, University of Asmara in Eritrea, University of Khartoum in Sudan, University of Oslo, and the University of Oxford. Chalhoun was a Fellow at the Swedish Collegium for Advanced Study in the Spring of 1994.

In 2000, Calhoun was appointed Benjamin Meaker Distinguished Visiting Professor at the University of Bristol. He was awarded an honorary doctorate by La Trobe University in Melbourne in 2005, and another by Erasmus University Rotterdam, in 2013 in recognition of his contributions to global sociology and public scholarship.

In 2019, he received the Sigillum Magnum from the University of Bologna, one of the highest honors the university confers on scholars who have made distinguished contributions to academia and public life.

From 2011 to 2021, he held the honorary chair Cosmopolitisme et Solidarité at the Maison de Sciences de L'Homme in Paris. He also served as a Faculty Fellow at Yale University's Center for Cultural Sociology since 2004 and held affiliations with institutions including the Technical University of Munich, Humboldt University of Berlin, and the University of Oslo.

Calhoun was elected to the American Philosophical Society in 2012, and in 2015 became a Fellow of both the British Academy (FBA) and the Academy of Social Sciences (FAcSS). He is also a Fellow of the New York Institute for the Humanities.

== Work ==
=== Presidency at the Social Science Research Council (1999–2012) ===
Calhoun served as president of the Social Science Research Council (SSRC) from 1999 to 2012. At the SSRC Calhoun expanded the public relevance of social science by strengthening partnerships and supporting interdisciplinary research agendas. Part of that includes initiatives that addressed major global challenges, including inequality, transnational migration, and crisis governance.

Under his direction, the SSRC launched the influential essay "Towards a More Public Social Science", which argued for bridging the divide between academic research and civic engagement. Following the attacks of September 11, 2001, Calhoun initiated a series of projects on "Real Time Social Science" which included a widely-read forums on the politics of risk and crisis.

This continued with work on the Privatization of Risk, Understanding Katrina: Perspectives from the Social Sciences Program, and now Haiti, Now and Next (examining the impact of the 2010 earthquake on Haiti's social and political future). His conversations with Paul Price have received wide circulation, podcast as Societas.

=== Directorship at the London School of Economics (2012–2016) ===
In 2012, Calhoun was appointed Director and President of the London School of Economics and Political Science (LSE). During his tenure, LSE expanded its fundraising capacity, launched major new research initiatives and oversaw the early planning for a new Global Center for Social Sciences. He secured substantial donations, including multi-million dollar gifts from the Marshall Foundation, Atlantic Philanthropies.

His tenure coincided with a period of heightened scrutiny of UK higher education, during which he was noted both for raising LSE's international profile and for internal debates about administrative compensation. Calhoun was in the academic year 2012-13 the beneficiary of "one of the biggest increases in overall pay and benefits" in the British higher education sector.

Under his leadership, LSE rose significantly from 71st to 35th best university in the world between 2014 and 2015 in QS World University Rankings.

BBC Controversy Involving LSE Students

In 2013, the BBC faced criticism for an undercover documentary filmed in North Korea, which involved students from the London School of Economics (LSE). Craig Calhoun, the director of the LSE at the time, expressed concerns about the potential risks posed to the students. He clarified that the trip was not officially sanctioned by LSE. The BBC defended its actions, stating the documentary aimed to provide insights into life inside North Korea. The BBC later apologized. Calhoun later commented on the incident, suggesting that the documentary might not have provided new information and only showcased what North Korea intended for tourists to see.

=== Berggruen Institute (2016-2018) ===
In December 2015 it was announced he would not seek a further term at LSE, Calhoun announced that after completing his term at LSE, he would return to the United States to become the inaugural President of the Berggruen Institute in Los Angeles.

As president of the Berggruen Institute, Calhoun launched the Berggruen Prize for Philosophy and Culture. A $1 million annual award that recognizes thinkers whose ideas shape human self-understanding and public life. He also oversaw campus development in Los Angeles and Beijing bringing into focus issues such as democracy, planetary governance, and technological ethics.

=== Arizona State University (since 2018) ===
Calhoun joined Arizona State University (ASU) in 2018 as University Professor of Social Sciences. At ASU, he holds appointments across several academic units, including the School for the Future of Innovation in Society, the School of Politics and Global Studies, and The College of Global Futures. His work at the university focuses on global political transformation, democracy, public knowledge, and the future of capitalism and climate governance.

He is involved in interdisciplinary research initiatives and contributes to the university’s efforts to link social science with real-world challenges. From 2021 to 2022, Calhoun also served as interim director of the Melikian Center for Eurasian and East European Studies at ASU.

== Honors ==
=== Academic fellowships and societal honors ===
- Fellow, British Academy (FBA), 2015
- Fellow, Academy of Social Sciences (FAcSS), 2015
- Member, American Philosophical Society, 2012
- Fellow, American Association for the Advancement of Science (AAAS), 2008
- Member, Sociological Research Association, 1994
- Member, Society for Comparative Research, 1998
- Fellow, Royal Society of Arts, 2012
- Member, Council on Foreign Relations, 2005
- Member, International Science Council, 2022
- Member, Chinese Academy of Social Sciences, 2000

=== Honorary degrees and medals ===
- Honorary Doctorate, La Trobe University, 2005
- Honorary Doctorate, Erasmus University Rotterdam, 2013
- Sigillum Magnum, University of Bologna, 2019

=== Awards for scholarship ===
- ASA Distinguished Book Award – Sociology in America, 2007
- ASA Distinguished Contribution to Scholarship – Neither Gods Nor Emperors, 1995
- Choice Outstanding Academic Title – The Question of Class Struggle (1982), Neither Gods Nor Emperors (1995)

=== Awards for teaching ===
- Teacher of the Year, NYU Sociology, 2005
- Professor of the Year, Columbia Sociology, 2006
- Order of the Golden Fleece, University of North Carolina, 1988

=== Named lectureships (selected) ===
- Tanner Lecture on Human Values, University of Michigan, 2013
- Jodidi Lecture, Harvard University, 2018
- Ralph Miliband Memorial Lecture, London School of Economics, 2012
- Thesis Eleven Lecture, La Trobe University, 2017
- Fred Halliday Memorial Lecture, LSE, 2013

== Publications ==
Craig Calhoun has published widely on topics such as democracy, social movements, nationalism, and critical social theory. His work has been translated into more than a dozen languages and is widely cited in the social sciences. Among which his most famous is a study of the Tiananmen Square protests of 1989, Neither Gods Nor Emperors: Students and the Struggle for Democracy in China (California, 1994). Notable among his publications are the following:

=== Authored books ===
- Calhoun, Craig (2022). Degenerations of Democracy. Cambridge: Harvard University Press. ISBN 9780674237582.
- Calhoun, Craig (2012). The Roots of Radicalism: Tradition, the Public Sphere, and Early Nineteenth-Century Social Movements. Chicago: University of Chicago Press. ISBN 9780226090863.
- Calhoun, Craig (2007). Nations Matter: Culture, History, and the Cosmopolitan Dream. London: Routledge. ISBN 9781134127580.
- Calhoun, Craig (1997). Nationalism. Minneapolis: University of Minnesota Press. ISBN 9780816631209.
- Calhoun, Craig (1995). Critical Social Theory: Culture, History, and the Challenge of Difference. Oxford: Wiley-Blackwell. ISBN 9781557862884.
- Calhoun, Craig (1994). Neither Gods Nor Emperors: Students and the Struggle for Democracy in China. Berkeley: University of California Press. ISBN 9780520088269.
- Calhoun, Craig (1982). The Question of Class Struggle: Social Foundations of Popular Radicalism During the Industrial Revolution. Chicago: University of Chicago Press. ISBN 9780226090900.

=== Edited volumes ===
- Calhoun, Craig; Fong, Benjamin (2023). The Green New Deal and the Transformation of Work. New York: Columbia University Press. ISBN 9780231205573.
- Calhoun, Craig; Mendieta, Eduardo; VanAntwerpen, Jonathan (2013). Habermas and Religion. Cambridge: Polity Press.
- Calhoun, Craig; Juergensmeyer, Mark; VanAntwerpen, Jonathan (2011). Rethinking Secularism. Oxford: Oxford University Press. ISBN 9780199796687.
- Calhoun, Craig; Warner, Michael; VanAntwerpen, Jonathan (2010). Varieties of Secularism in a Secular Age. Cambridge: Harvard University Press.
- Calhoun, Craig; Sennett, Richard (2007). Practicing Culture. London: Routledge.
- Calhoun, Craig; Gerteis, Joseph; Moody, James; Pfaff, Steven; Virk, Indermohan (2007). Contemporary Sociological Theory, 2nd ed. Oxford: Blackwell Publishing.
- Calhoun, Craig; Gerteis, Joseph; Moody, James; Pfaff, Steven; Virk, Indermohan (2007). Classical Sociological Theory, 2nd ed. Oxford: Blackwell Publishing.
- Calhoun, Craig (2007). Sociology in America: A History. Chicago: University of Chicago Press.
- Calhoun, Craig; Rojek, Chris; Turner, Bryan (2006). Sage Handbook of Sociology. London: Sage Publications.
- Calhoun, Craig (2005). Lessons of Empire: Imperial Histories and American Power. New York: The New Press.
- Calhoun, Craig; Price, Paul; Timmer, Ashley (2002). Understanding September 11. New York: The New Press.
- Calhoun, Craig; McGowan, John (1997). Hannah Arendt and the Meaning of Politics. Minneapolis: University of Minnesota Press.
- Calhoun, Craig (1994). Social Theory and the Politics of Identity. Oxford: Wiley-Blackwell.
- Calhoun, Craig; LiPuma, Edward; Postone, Moishe (1993). Bourdieu: Critical Perspectives. Cambridge: Polity Press / Chicago: University of Chicago Press.
- Calhoun, Craig (1992). Habermas and the Public Sphere. Cambridge, MA: MIT Press. ISBN 9780262531146.
- Calhoun, Craig; Scott, W. Richard; Meyer, Marshall (1990). Structures of Power and Constraint: Essays in Honor of Peter M. Blau. Cambridge: Cambridge University Press.
- Calhoun, Craig; Ianni, F.A.J. (1976). The Anthropological Study of Education. The Hague: Mouton / Chicago: Aldine.

=== Editorial and reference works ===
- Calhoun, Craig (2002). Dictionary of the Social Sciences. Oxford: Oxford University Press.

Academic offices
Preceded by Judith Rees	Director of the London School of Economics; 2012–2016	Succeeded by Dame Nemat Shafik
