= Yonder (company) =

American information integrity company

- Formation: April 7, 2015; 11 years ago
- Founded at: Austin, Texas
- CEO: Jonathon Morgan
- Website: www.yonder-ai.com
- Formerly called: New Knowledge, Popily

Yonder, formerly named New Knowledge, formerly named Popily, was a company from Austin, Texas, that specialized in disinformation research.

The company is most widely known for supporting the Senate Select Committee on Intelligence in its investigation of Russian interference in the 2016 US presidential election. The company was also involved in a disinformation operation during the 2017 US Senate special election in Alabama, though the company denied any political motivation behind its research. More recently, Yonder's CEO and researchers have provided expert commentary to the New York Times, Fast Company, and Axios about 5G and COVID-19 misinformation.

Yonder CEO, Jonathon Morgan, was profiled in HBO's 2020 documentary, After Truth: Disinformation and the Cost of Fake News. The company's former Director of Research, Renée DiResta, was a featured expert in the Netflix documentary The Social Dilemma. DiResta was later the subject of multiple installments of the Twitter Files that criticized her involvement in multiple disinformation research projects, including Yonder, and her stint as a CIA fellow early in her career. DiResta has denied accusations that she still works for the CIA.

== Background ==
The company was originally started as a research project inside of the crowdmapping and election monitoring non-profit Ushahidi and was eventually spun-out as a for-profit company in 2015.

Lux Capital and GGV Capital provided $11 million in capital for the company in 2018.

In January 2018, Kelly Perdew, a former army intelligence officer and the winner of the second season of The Apprentice, joined the board of directors and invested in the company through his firm Moonshot Capital. Moonshot Capital was cofounded by former National Security Agency (NSA) intelligence officer Craig Cummings.

In January 2018, the company announced that Ryan Fox, a 15-year veteran of the National Security Agency, had joined the company as a cofounder and board member.

In December 2018, the company published a report titled "The Tactics and Tropes of the Internet Research Agency" that was commissioned by the Senate Select Committee on Intelligence.

Two days after this report was published, a New York Times article showcased the company's participation in an experiment in the 2017 Senate special election in Alabama. Renée DiResta, one of the principal authors of the Senate report on the Internet Research Agency, said that as she understood it the goal of the New Knowledge research was to investigate how Facebook's content curation algorithms rewarded "sensational news". Facebook responded by suspending the personal accounts of Morgan and four others.

== Hamilton 68 ==
Launched August 2, 2017, Hamilton 68 Dashboard was a tool designed by German Marshall Fund's Alliance for Securing Democracy (ASD) to track Russian influence operations on social media.

Yonder CEO Jonathon Morgan was one of four outside researchers who collaborated on the Hamilton 68 dashboard, alongside Clint Watts, J.M. Berger, and Andrew Weisburd. The dashboard monitored alleged Russian disinformation on Twitter.

In January 2023, journalist Matt Taibbi tweeted about internal Twitter documents related to Hamilton 68 as the 15th installment of the Twitter Files. The documents show that Twitter's former Head of Trust and Safety, Yoel Roth, attempted to identify the accounts tracked in the dashboard. Roth found that only 36 of the 644 accounts he identified were registered in Russia and argued that the dashboard used "shoddy methodology" to incorrectly label authentic accounts as "Russian stooges without evidence". ASD responded to Taibbi's release a few days later, noting that ASD had always maintained that not all of the accounts on the dashboard were controlled by Russia, despite what it described as persistent misunderstandings in the media.

== Project Birmingham ==
Through his political investment firm Investing In US, Democratic donor Reid Hoffman donated $750,000 to American Engagement Technologies (AET), a company founded by former Obama campaign advisor and administration appointee Mikey Dickerson. AET then provided funding for New Knowledge to engage in a disinformation campaign in Alabama known as Project Birmingham. Hoffman has disavowed the tactics used and denied any specific knowledge of the project.

Morgan described his Alabama activities as "almost like a thought experiment," asking: "Is it as easy as it might seem?" New Knowledge authored a Senate Intelligence Committee report on Russian disinformation while these operations were ongoing.

== Project Maven ==
Project Maven is a project developed at the US Department of Defense to develop machine learning algorithms to analyze and fuse vast amounts of surveillance data from multiple sources and use integrated data from drones, satellites, other sensors, and social media to flag potential targets, present findings to human analysts, and relay their decisions to operational systems.

In 2018, Booz Allen Hamilton, was awarded a large prime award as part of Project Maven totaling $751.5 Million. One of the companies subcontracted for social media analytics as part of this award was Yonder under its corporate registration name Popily, Inc. Primer Technologies, the company that would later acquire Yonder in 2022, participated in Project Maven as part of a separate award in 2021 “examine data and develop algorithms.”

== Disinformation research ==
=== Russian disinformation ===
In December 2018, Yonder published a report titled "The Tactics and Tropes of the Internet Research Agency" that was commissioned by the Senate Select Committee on Intelligence.

In 2018, the company launched Disinfo2018, a project launched in collaboration with the Daniel J. Jones's Democracy Integrity Project. Democracy Integrity Project paid New Knowledge (listed under the registered corporate name Popily, Inc.) $230,000 by the according the project's 2018 tax filings. Jones founded The Democracy Integrity Project through grant made by George Soros and other Silicon Valley billionaires, funded Fusion GPS.

During course of the Disinfo2018 project the company reported that three of the top 15 URLs shared by the 800 social media accounts affiliated with known and suspected Russian propaganda operations were supporting then-Democratic primary candidate Tulsi Gabbard. The company also reported Russian propaganda was also supporting Green candidate Jill Stein's 2016 campaign

=== DARPA's Active Social Engineering Defense (ASED) ===
In 2018, Yonder collaborated with software companies Uncharted and Qntfy on Defense Advanced Research Projects Agency's (DARPA) Active Social Engineering Defense (ASED) to invent human-in-loop systems capable of influencing for large populations for the purposes of using enterprise-scale bots for defense against social engineering attacks.

=== Covid-19 disinformation ===
In 2020, Yonder released a report alleging Anti Vaxxer factions and 4chan users involvement with narratives regarding Vitamin C as a hypothetical COVID-19 treatment which Morgan stated had debunked in a report by CNN.

=== 5G conspiracy theories ===
In 2020, Yonder released a report about a spike in social media posts claiming 5G technology is linked to COVID-19.

== Acquisition ==
In June 2022, it was announced that Yonder was acquired by technology company Primer.
