= Scott Samuel =

Scott Samuel is an American entrepreneur best known as the founder of Honesty.com, an early provider of tools and services for online-auction sellers. He created the Honesty auction counter, which became widely used on eBay listings and was later incorporated into Andale's services. Samuel later served as chief community officer of Andale Inc. and founded Ethical Technologies, LLC.

== Career ==
In 1985, while a student at North Central College, Samuel and Jeff Bellandi set up Speakeasy, a subscription computer chat system, in the basement of Samuel's home in Darien, Illinois. The system allowed modem users to communicate with one another in real time and operated using six telephone lines and an Apple II computer. Samuel graduated from North Central College in 1990 with a BA in history and later worked as a high school teacher.

Samuel operated a collectibles business on eBay and became known within its user community for placing a page counter on his auction listings. After other eBay sellers asked how they could add similar counters to their own listings, Samuel created a free counter called Honesty and distributed it through Honesty.com. Greg Holden later described Samuel as the inventor of the auction counters subsequently used by Andale. In a 2004 interview, Samuel said that approximately 20,000 people were using Honesty counters daily by the end of 1998, increasing to roughly 100,000 three months later.

In 1999, eBay closed its live customer-support boards and replaced them with an email-based support system. Samuel criticized the decision, telling Fortune, "There was a joke going around: 'I guess there are no more problems at eBay' ... These are your customers—you don't do that."

Honesty.com was established in March 1999 and later acquired the Online Traders Web Alliance (OTWA). Although Honesty.com's free services generated little direct revenue, they attracted a large audience of online-auction users, which Andale saw as a potential market for its paid services. In July 2000, Honesty.com and Andale Inc. announced a merger under the Andale name with Samuel becoming Andale's chief community officer. The financial terms of the merger were not disclosed.

Reid Hoffman, Ben Casnocha and Chris Yeh later cited Honesty.com's auction-counter model as an influence on PayPal's early growth strategy. They wrote that PayPal employees looked to Honesty.com's use of counters on eBay listings for inspiration before implementing the "Pay with PayPal" feature, after which PayPal's growth accelerated.

At the 2004 eBay Live convention, Samuel participated in the eBay Community Celebrity Auction, a charity event benefiting the Disabled Online Users Association (DOUA).
