= Giovanni Battista Vacchi =

Italian businessman (born 1966)

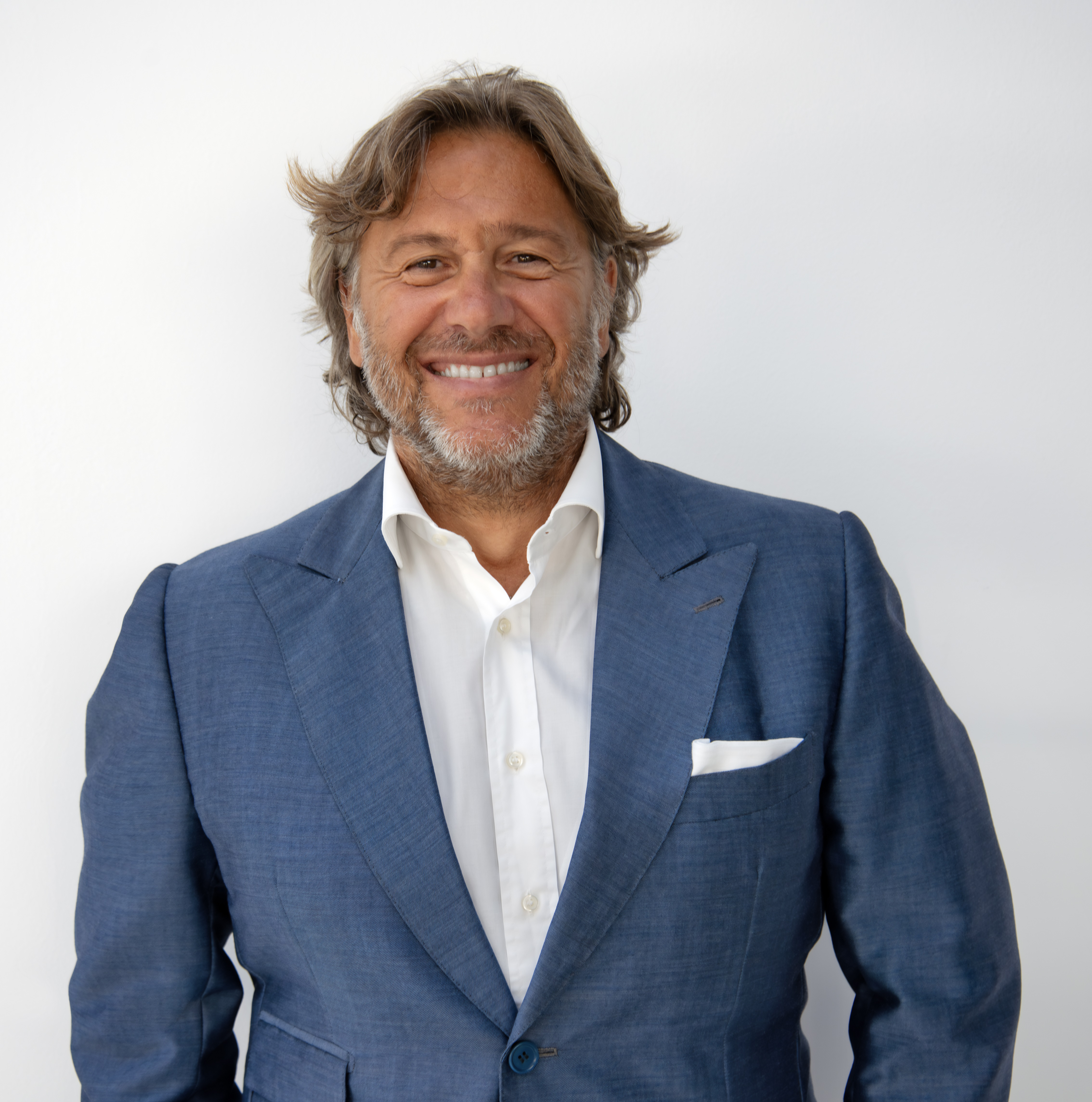
- Born: 13 February 1966 (age 60); Bologna, Italy
- Known for: CEO of Colombini Group

Giovanni Battista Vacchi (born 13 February 1966, Bologna, Italy) is an Italian businessman. He is the CEO of Colombini Group, specializing in design and furniture. Former Italian national squash team member and participant of the 1989 Men's World Team Squash Championships, he won the Italian junior squash championship (1984).

== Education ==
Giovanni Battista Vacchi graduated summa cum laude in Economics and Business at the University of Bologna and earned an MBA (Master of Business Administration in the United States) from the Tuck School of Business at Dartmouth College.

== Career ==
Giovanni Battista Vacchi worked in multinational strategy consulting firms, start-ups, and international companies, focusing on international growth and development activities and corporate restructuring.

In 1996, he began his managerial career in private equity at the Boston-based strategy consulting firm Bain & Company and later at the international strategic asset, management, and private equity firm The Carlyle Group.

In 2001, he began working for Ferretti Group, an Italian multinational shipbuilding company, covering roles as chief financial officer and SVP business development and marketing until becoming executive chairman of Ferretti Group USA in 2005. At the same time, he became executive chairman and CEO of Bertram Yachts based in Miami.

During his career, he has also held positions in several industrial companies, including chief sales and marketing officer at CityLife S.p.a, which in 2010 was the largest real estate development (commercial and residential) in Europe as well as in other industrial, transportation, fashion and design realities.

He served as CEO of the companies Zucchi Bassetti and Grandi Navi Veloci Spa.

From 2016 to 2019, he served as Head of EY Parthenon Italy, the strategy consulting arm of EY.

In 2019, he joined Colombini Group, a company founded in 1965 and operating in the design and furniture sector, that incorporates brands, including Febal Casa, Colombini Casa, Colombini Group Contract, Offic'è, Rossana and has acquired 60% of Bontempi Casa.

=== Appointments ===
Giovanni Battista Vacchi is a member of the board of directors of Quick SpA, Cantiere del Pardo Spa, Baldinini srl and Manifatture Sigaro Toscano Spa.

He is a lecturer on the course Luxury Goods: Boats, Cars, Design Furniture at the Bologna Business School.

== Sport ==
Giovanni Battista Vacchi was a player on the Italian national squash team.

In 1984, he won the Italian Junior championship and then participated in seven European Team Championships.

In 1989, he participated in the World Championship in Singapore with the Italian team.

== Book ==
In February 2022, he published his first book, The Heart of Leadership with Danilo Zatta, published by Hoepli Editore.
