= Reid Hoffman =

American internet entrepreneur (born 1967)

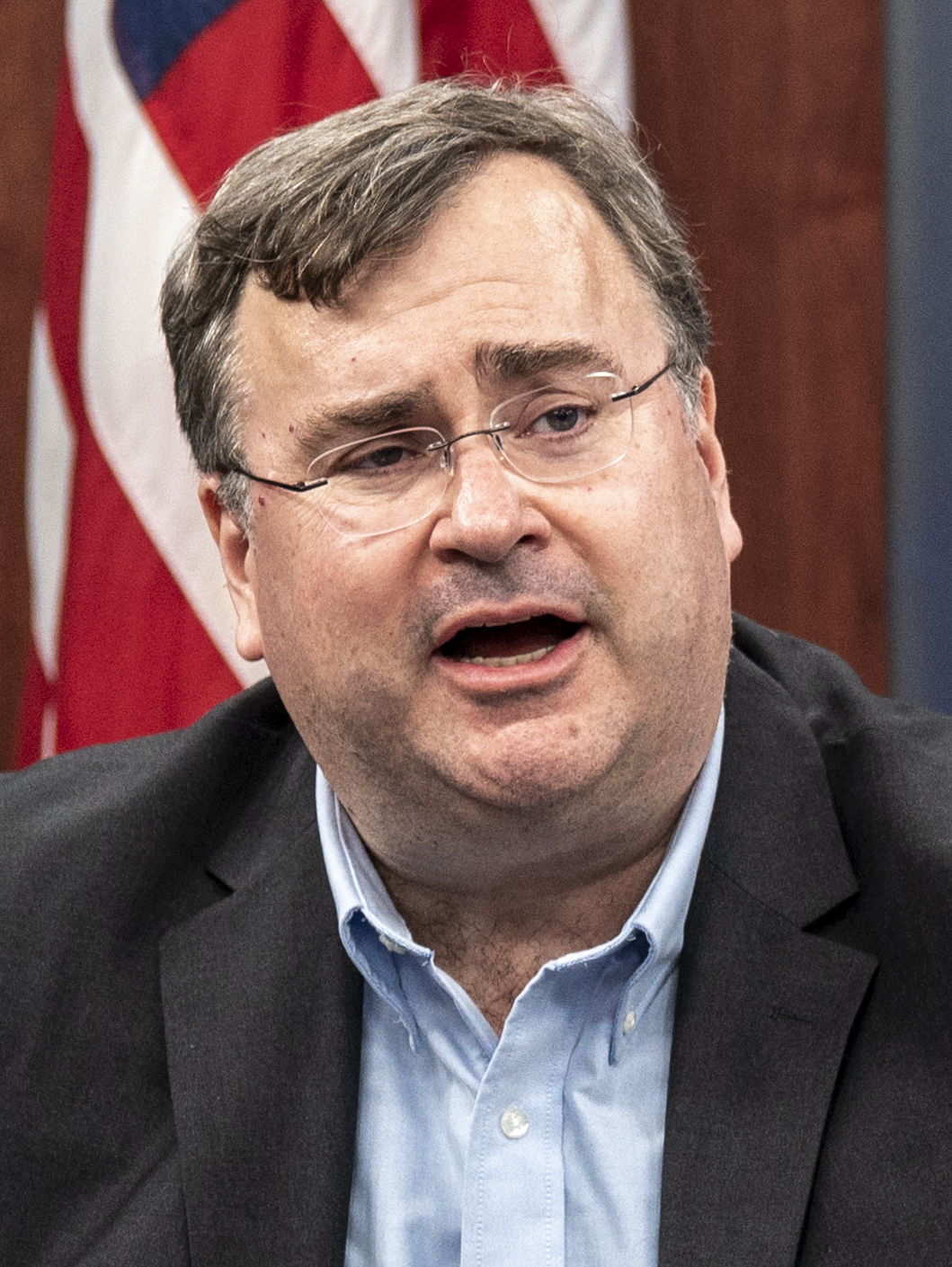
- Hoffman in 2022
- Born: Reid Garrett Hoffman; August 5, 1967 (age 59); Palo Alto, California, U.S.
- Education: Stanford University (BS); Wolfson College, Oxford (MSt)
- Occupations: Co-founder, LinkedIn; VC partner at Greylock; Co-founder, Inflection AI; Co-founder, Manas AI
- Board member of: Microsoft; Arc Institute
- Spouse: Michelle Yee (m. 2004)
- Website: reidhoffman.org

Reid Garrett Hoffman (born August 5, 1967) is an American Internet entrepreneur, venture capitalist, podcaster, and author. Hoffman is the co-founder and former executive chairman of LinkedIn, a business-oriented social network used primarily for professional networking. He is also chairman of venture capital firm Village Global, a co-founder of Inflection AI, a co-founder of Manas AI, and a board member at Arc Institute.

Hoffman has been an influential figure in political circles, a member of the Bilderberg Group since at least 2011 and the Council on Foreign Relations since 2015. He has actively participated in political funding and advocacy, contributing to various campaigns and organizations, and has been a vocal proponent of democratic institutions and humanism in technological innovation. As of May 2026, Forbes estimates his net worth to be $2.7 billion.

== Early life and education ==
Hoffman was born on August 5, 1967, in Palo Alto, California. He was a year old when his parents, who were both attorneys, got divorced. Hoffman was an avid table-top role-playing gamer as a child and worked as an editor at the game company Chaosium, then based in Oakland, California, near his home.

Hoffman attended high school at the progressive Putney School in Vermont, where he engaged in farming activities. He graduated from Stanford University in 1990 with a Bachelor of Science in symbolic systems and cognitive science. He was awarded a Marshall Scholarship for graduate study abroad, and he earned a Master of Studies (MSt) in philosophy from Wolfson College, Oxford, in 1993.

His paternal great-great-great-grandfather was Theophilus Adam Wylie, a Presbyterian minister and Indiana University president pro tempore. Hoffman's uncle, Eric Hoffman, is a writer.

== Career ==
=== Early years ===
Hoffman joined Apple Computer in 1994, where he worked on eWorld, an early attempt at building an online service. AOL acquired eWorld in 1996. He later worked at Fujitsu before co-founding his first company, SocialNet.com, in 1997. It focused "on online dating and matching up people with similar interests, like golfers who were looking for partners in their neighborhood."

=== PayPal ===
Hoffman was a member of PayPal's board of directors at the time it was founded. In January 2000, he left SocialNet and joined PayPal full-time as the company's COO. In June 2000, Hoffman became PayPal's Senior VP of Business Development, after a re-organization of PayPal's executive structure by then-CEO Elon Musk.

=== LinkedIn ===
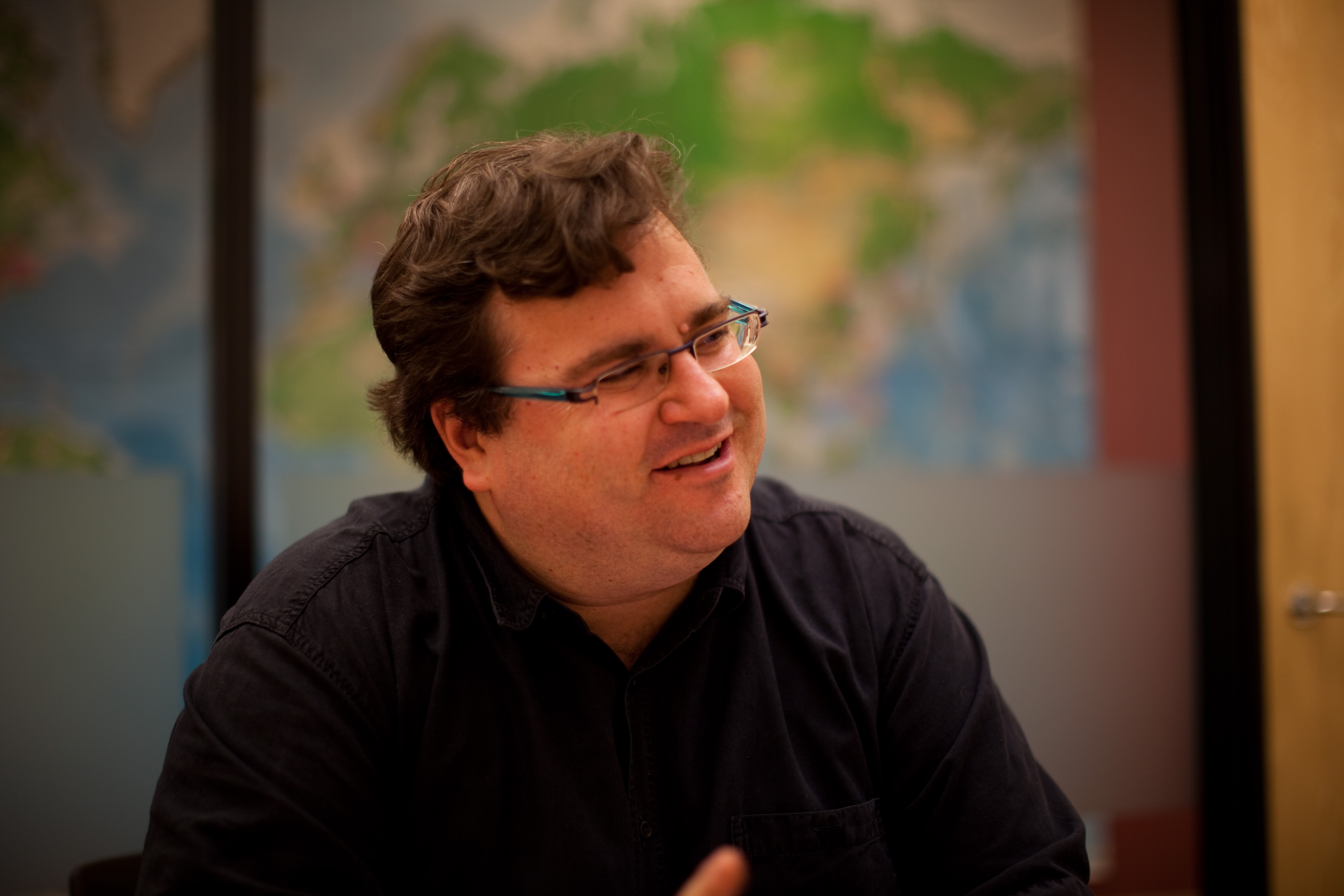
Hoffman speaks at an event in 2008.

Hoffman co-founded LinkedIn in December 2002 with two former colleagues from SocialNet (including Allen Blue) and one former colleague from his time at Fujitsu. LinkedIn launched on May 5, 2003, as one of the first business-oriented online social networks. Peter Thiel, a colleague of Hoffman's at PayPal, invested in LinkedIn. At the time of LinkedIn's IPO on May 19, 2011, Hoffman owned a stake worth an estimated $2.34 billion, not including any potential benefits from Greylock Partners, where he was named a partner in 2009.

Microsoft proposed to acquire LinkedIn on June 13, 2016, for $26.2 billion in cash. Hoffman became a Microsoft board member on March 14, 2017.

=== Artificial intelligence ventures ===
==== OpenAI ====
In 2016, Reid Hoffman was among the first donors to OpenAI, a non-profit artificial intelligence research organization established by Sam Altman, Elon Musk, and others. In February 2018, Elon Musk departed from OpenAI's board, citing potential conflicts with his role at Tesla, due to Tesla's AI development for self-driving cars.

Following Musk's exit, OpenAI faced financial challenges due to the shortfall in anticipated funding. With Hoffman's help, OpenAI transitioned to a "capped-profit" model by establishing a for-profit subsidiary to attract investment while maintaining its commitment to ethical AI development. Hoffman led the investment into the for-profit subsidiary through his family foundation and joined the company's board of directors.

On March 3, 2023, Hoffman resigned from his board seat at OpenAI, citing a desire to avoid conflicts of interest between his board seat at OpenAI, investments in AI technology companies via Greylock Partners, and role as founder of Inflection AI.

==== Inflection AI ====
In March 2022, it was announced that Hoffman was co-founding a new startup, Inflection AI, with his long-time friend and Greylock colleague Mustafa Suleyman, the co-founder of DeepMind. CNBC reported that "Headquartered in Silicon Valley, Inflection will aim to develop AI software products that make it easier for humans to communicate with computers."

In March 2024, Microsoft licensed Inflection AI's technology and hired Mustafa Suleyman, along with Inflection CSO Karén Simonyan and most of the company's 70 employees, in a deal reportedly worth $650 million. Following this transition, Inflection AI hired Sean White as CEO and shifted its focus to enterprise AI solutions.

In September 2024, the UK Competition and Markets Authority cleared Microsoft's hiring of former staff from Inflection AI, the AI startup Hoffman co-founded, along with associated arrangements between the companies.

==== Manas AI ====
In January 2025, Hoffman launched Manas AI, an AI-enabled drug discovery startup, together with cancer researcher Siddhartha Mukherjee, with about $25 million in initial funding.

==== ReidAI ====
In April 2024, Hoffman "sat down" for an interview with an AI deepfake of himself, one of the first public figures to do so. "In their conversation, the two Reids discussed AI regulation, its capabilities, and ways Hoffman can improve his LinkedIn profile." According to Hoffman, the bot was "built on OpenAI's GPT-4 and trained on over 20 years' worth of material provided by Hoffman's public speaking engagements and the books he's published." Hoffman told Axios' Mike Allen that ReidAI's purpose was to show "the positive things we can do with all these technologies."

==== Other artificial intelligence ventures ====
In late 2022, Hoffman and others invested a total of $2.2 million in JusticeText. "Geared towards public defenders," the platform "stores, catalogs, analyzes and then shares video evidence, hoping to increase transparency around criminal matters."

As of May 2023, Hoffman and Greylock Partners have invested in at least 37 AI companies. For example, they were an early investor in Tome, makers of productivity software driven by AI. The company claims it is the fastest productivity software maker in reaching 1 million users.

Hoffman has dismissed calls to "pause" the development of advanced AI systems, calling such ideas "foolish" and "anti-humanist." Instead, he has called for the pace of development to be accelerated to help humans solve societal problems. For example, he has pointed to "its potential to transform areas like health care — "giving everyone a medical assistant"; and education — "giving everyone a tutor... I'm a tech optimist, not a tech utopian."

Inc. dubbed Hoffman the "evangelist in chief" for Inflection AI and AI in general, citing his meetings with the likes of President Biden and the Pope to discuss his vision and concerns around AI.

=== Investing ===
After the PayPal sale to eBay, Hoffman became one of Silicon Valley's most prolific angel investors. Dave Goldberg, former CEO of SurveyMonkey, said that Hoffman "is the person you want to talk to when you are starting a company." In 2009, Hoffman joined Greylock Partners.

According to David Kirkpatrick's book The Facebook Effect, Hoffman arranged the first meeting between Mark Zuckerberg and Peter Thiel, which led to Thiel's initial $500,000 angel investment in Facebook. Hoffman invested alongside Thiel in Facebook's first financing round.

Since 2009, Hoffman has provided venture capital to dozens of businesses across industries, including consumer and transportation technology, finance, and artificial intelligence. Examples include Airbnb, where he led the company's Series A financing round, Aurora Innovation, Taptap Send, and Helion Energy.

He served on Zynga's board of directors from March 2008 to June 2014 and currently serves on several public boards, including Aurora, Joby Aviation, and Microsoft.

Hoffman has made multiple investments in transportation technology companies, including Aurora, Convoy, Nauto, Nuro, and Joby Aviation, among others.

An early advocate for cryptocurrency, Hoffman led Greylock's 2014 Series A financing round in Xapo, a company that developed a bitcoin wallet product.

In August 2023, Hoffman said he will not serve as a general partner for Greylock's upcoming funds, but will continue to serve as a venture partner.

Hoffman has invested in California Forever, a company developing a planned city in Solano County, California.

=== Teaching ===
Hoffman teaches the free Stanford University class "Blitzscaling".

In 2023, Hoffman delivered the Commencement Speech at Bologna Business School, urging students to prepare for the transformative potential of AI as a tool for amplifying human creativity, collaboration, and progress.

In 2024, Hoffman delivered a keynote lecture at the International Journalism Festival in Perugia, Italy, balance progress and responsibility while shaping a future where technology amplifies human potential and interconnectedness.

Hoffman delivered a lecture at the LSE School of Public Policy focusing on the transformative impact of artificial intelligence on society, governance, and global dynamics. He was appointed a Visiting Senior Fellow at the school in February 2025.

In May 2025, Chiba Institute of Technology conferred an honorary doctorate to Hoffman along with Laurene Powell Jobs and Jigme Khesar Namgyel Wangchuck in honor of their contributions to society.

Together with Prof. Fred Kofman, Senior Leadership Coach at Google, former MIT Professor and Zur Genosar, Israeli businessman and mindfulness teacher, the three founded The Hoffman Kofman Foundation, a non-profit organization that aims to develop leaders into active exemplars of excellence who elicit internal commitment to a shared mission of creating social and economic value from their followers and team members.

== Publications ==
=== The Start-Up of You ===
Hoffman is co-author, with Ben Casnocha, of the career book The Start-Up of You: Adapt to the Future, Invest in Yourself, and Transform your Career.

The book was released in the United States on February 14, 2012. It argues that individuals should think of themselves as businesses-of-one – the "CEO of their own career" – and draws many parallels between lessons learned from the stories of successful Silicon Valley technology companies and an individual's career.

Publishers Weekly reviewed the book positively, saying, "with plenty of valuable guidance relevant to any career stage, this book will help readers not only survive professionally in times of uncertainty but stand out from the pack and flourish." The Economist said that "Hoffman and Casnocha make a number of astute observations about shifts in the world of work."

The book became both a New York Times and Wall Street Journal bestseller.

=== The Alliance ===
Hoffman is co-author, with Ben Casnocha and Chris Yeh, of the management book The Alliance: Managing Talent in the Networked Age.

The book was released in the United States on July 8, 2014. It argues that previous career models of lifetime employment and free agency no longer work in a business world defined by continuous change. Instead, it proposes that employers and employees should think of each other as "allies" and move from a transactional approach to employment to a "relational" one.

The book became a New York Times bestseller. Arianna Huffington named The Alliance "the must-read book of the summer" in 2014. A Financial Times review was mixed, noting that those who aren't well-versed on the changing nature of the workplace may find the book useful, but readers looking for more surprising or in-depth insights will be disappointed.

=== Blitzscaling ===
Hoffman is co-author, with Chris Yeh, of the book Blitzscaling: The Lightning-Fast Path to Building Massively Valuable Companies. The book was released in the United States on October 9, 2018. It argues that the secret to starting and scaling massively valuable companies is "blitzscaling", a set of techniques for "scaling up at a dizzying pace that blows competitors out of the water."

=== Impromptu: Amplifying Our Humanity Through AI ===
On March 13, 2023, Hoffman released the book Impromptu: Amplifying Our Humanity Through AI. Hoffman claims to have written the book using the large language model GPT-4. It became a Wall Street Journal bestseller in April of that year.

=== Superagency: What Could Possibly Go Right With our AI Future ===
On January 28, 2025, Hoffman released the book Superagency: What Could Possibly Go Right With our AI Future with his co-author Greg Beato. The book offers a roadmap for how society can integrate AI inclusively and adaptively to improve our lives and create massive positive change. The book became a New York Times bestseller. Hoffman used AI to create personalized book covers, featuring AI generated images and custom book blurbs for customers.

=== Podcasts ===
On April 25, 2017, Reid Hoffman announced the launch of a business and finance podcast called Masters of Scale, with the first episode of the podcast launching on May 3, 2017. The podcast is produced by WaitWhat, a media company led by former TED executives June Cohen and Deron Triff and hosted by Hoffman who interviews notable entrepreneurs and business and political leaders. The Masters of Scale podcast has featured interviews with well-known founders and leaders including Airbnb co-founder and CEO Brian Chesky, Netflix co-founder Reed Hastings, Uber CEO Dara Khosrowshahi, Huffington Post and Thrive Global founder Arianna Huffington, Imagine Entertainment founders, Brian Grazer & Ron Howard, Ariel Investments co-CEO Mellody Hobson, and President Barack Obama. Since its launch, Masters of Scale has won several Webby and Signal awards.

In March 2023, Hoffman and his Chief of Staff Aria Finger began hosting a podcast called Possible. According to its creators, the podcast "sketches out the brightest version of the future—and what it will take to get there". The podcast has won three Webby Awards. In 2024, the episode featuring Trevor Noah won best Individual Episode and the episode featuring Bryan Stevenson won best Crime and Justice episode. In 2025, the episode featuring Kara Swisher won best Individual Episode.

== Honors and awards ==
- In March 2025, Hoffman was appointed a Distinguished Academic Visitor at Queens' College, Cambridge.
- In February 2025, Hoffman was appointed a Visiting Senior Fellow at the London School of Economics.
- In 2024, Hoffman was appointed a Distinguished Fellow at the Columbia University Institute of Global Politics
- In September 2023, Hoffman received Sigillum Magnum from University of Bologna during the Bologna Business School's commencement.
- In 2022, Hoffman delivered the commencement address at Vanderbilt University and received Vanderbilt's Nichols-Chancellor's Medal.
- In 2017 he was appointed an Honorary Commander of the Order of the British Empire (CBE), "For services to promoting UK business and social networking and the Marshall Scholarship scheme".
- In September 2014, the American Academy of Achievement awarded Hoffman with the annual Golden Plate award, which honors accomplished individuals "for significant achievement in their fields."
- In April 2014, President Barack Obama named Hoffman as a Presidential Ambassador for Global Entrepreneurship "to help develop the next generation of entrepreneurs."
- In April 2014, Hoffman received the Distinguished Citizen Award from the Commonwealth Club of California.
- In May 2012, Hoffman was ranked third on the Forbes Midas List of the top tech investors. Forbes described Hoffman as "Silicon Valley's uber-investor" and said Hoffman "has had a hand in creating nearly every lucrative social media startup."
- In 2012, The Martin Luther King Jr. Center honored Hoffman with their "Salute to Greatness" award which "recognizes individuals and corporations or organizations that exemplify excellence in leadership and a commitment to social responsibility in the spirit of Martin Luther King, Jr."
- In 2012, Hoffman, along with Salman Khan of Khan Academy, was honored by the World Affairs Council and Global Philanthropy Forum in 2012. The council recognizes and honors remarkable leaders who have effected and will continue to effect social change through their private enterprise and social action. The awards in 2012 were dedicated to celebrating Technology for Social Impact.
- Hoffman was awarded the 2012 David Packard Medal of Achievement Award by TechAmerica for his contributions and advances within the high-tech industry, his community, and humankind.
- Hoffman received an Honorary Doctor of Laws from Babson College in 2012.
- In 2011, Hoffman and Jeff Weiner of LinkedIn shared the EY U.S. Entrepreneur of the Year Award.

== Personal life ==
In 2004, Hoffman married Michelle Yee. The couple resides in Seattle, Washington. Hoffman is an avid player of board games, including Settlers of Catan, and has said that such games are good training for business.

In July 2024, The Washington Post reported that Hoffman had made a multimillion-dollar investment in the election technology company Smartmatic, which is currently undertaking defamation action against several press outlets.

=== Relationship with Jeffrey Epstein ===
Hoffman reportedly first encountered Jeffrey Epstein through the MIT Media Lab when he helped solicit donations to the lab from Epstein. In July 2013, Epstein met with Hoffman and others at the MIT campus. In 2019, it was reported that Hoffman had hosted a dinner attended by Epstein along with Elon Musk and Mark Zuckerberg. In September 2023, The Wall Street Journal reported that Hoffman visited Epstein's private island for a weekend in 2014. Hoffman claimed that the purpose of the meeting was to raise funds for the Massachusetts Institute of Technology and that he regretted interacting with Epstein.

In October 2025, Hoffman's name was brought up in a Senate hearing on Epstein while questioning attorney general Pam Bondi. Bondi called Reid Hoffman one of Epstein's closest confidants while being questioned by Senator Sheldon Whitehouse. On November 14, 2025, President Trump directed the U.S. Department of Justice to investigate Epstein's relationship with, among others, Hoffman. Hoffman released a statement calling on President Trump to release all of the Epstein Files, and "expose the people who had both deep and ongoing relationships with Epstein." Hoffman funded a PSA created by World Without Exploitation featuring several of Jeffrey Epstein’s victims advocating for the release of files related to the convicted sex offender to run nationally on Monday Night Football.

In February 2026, newly released Epstein files revealed an email sent on Christmas Eve 2014 from Hoffman, noting "ice-cream...for the girls" and another item to "strike your funny bone for the island."

== Philanthropy ==
Hoffman served from 2006 until 2025 on the board of Kiva.org (peer-to-peer microlending pioneer that allows people to lend money via the internet to low-income/underserved entrepreneurs and students). He currently serves on the boards of Endeavor Global (an organization that finds and supports high-impact entrepreneurs in emerging markets), and New America (a think tank that focuses on a range of public policy issues, including national security, technology, health, gender, education, and the economy). He's the founding donor and board member at Opportunity@Work, an organization that seeks to eliminate the opportunity gap and provide millions of highly skilled but under-credentialed Americans (often from marginalized, rural and racially diverse backgrounds) better pathways to higher-paying jobs and careers. Hoffman is on the board of Lever for Change, an affiliate of the MacArthur Foundation, which connects donors with problem solvers to find and fund bold, effective solutions to accelerate social change. He's also on the board of the Berggruen Institute, a think tank.

Hoffman formerly served on the advisory council of the MIT Media Lab and as chair of the advisory board for QuestBridge (a provider of talented low-income students to top colleges/universities). Hoffman was also the first major funder of Crisis Text Line, a free, 24/7 crisis service via SMS in the US. In 2013, Hoffman provided a $250,000 matching grant (equivalent to $340,200 in 2025) to Code for America. In July 2016, Hoffman funded the $250,000 cash-prize (equivalent to $328,200 in 2025) MIT Media Lab MIT Disobedience Award, an award created by Hoffman and Joi Ito to honor and recognize acts of disobedience resulting in positive social impact. In November 2016, Hoffman and his wife, Michelle Yee, donated $20 million (equivalent to $26,260,000 in 2025) to the Chan Zuckerberg Initiative, a charity dedicated to eradicating disease by 2100. Hoffman and Yee's donation was for the Biohub, the Initiative's San Francisco laboratory. Hoffman also joined the board of the Biohub project. In May 2018, Hoffman and Yee joined The Giving Pledge, "a global effort to help address society's most pressing problems by encouraging the wealthiest individuals and families to give the majority of their wealth to philanthropic causes."

Hoffman is also a long-time supporter of Second Harvest of Silicon Valley. In 2021, in response to the massive increased need due to the pandemic, he offered to match any donations to the food bank, up to $2 million (equivalent to $2,341,000 in 2025).

=== Artificial intelligence philanthropy ===
Hoffman is one of the backers of the Ethics and Governance of Artificial Intelligence Fund, a joint venture between the MIT Media Lab and the Berkman Klein Center for Internet & Society at Harvard University. He is on the board of the Stanford Institute for Human-Centered Artificial Intelligence (HAI), whose mission is to "advance AI research, education, policy and practice to improve the human condition", and launched the institute's Hoffman-Yee Research Grants to "fund interdisciplinary teams with research spanning HAI's key areas of focus: understanding the human and societal impact of AI, augmenting human capabilities, and developing AI technologies inspired by human intelligence". In 2018, Hoffman made a gift to the University of Toronto's Faculty of Information, to endow a chair "to study how the new era of artificial intelligence (AI) will affect our lives."

== Politics ==
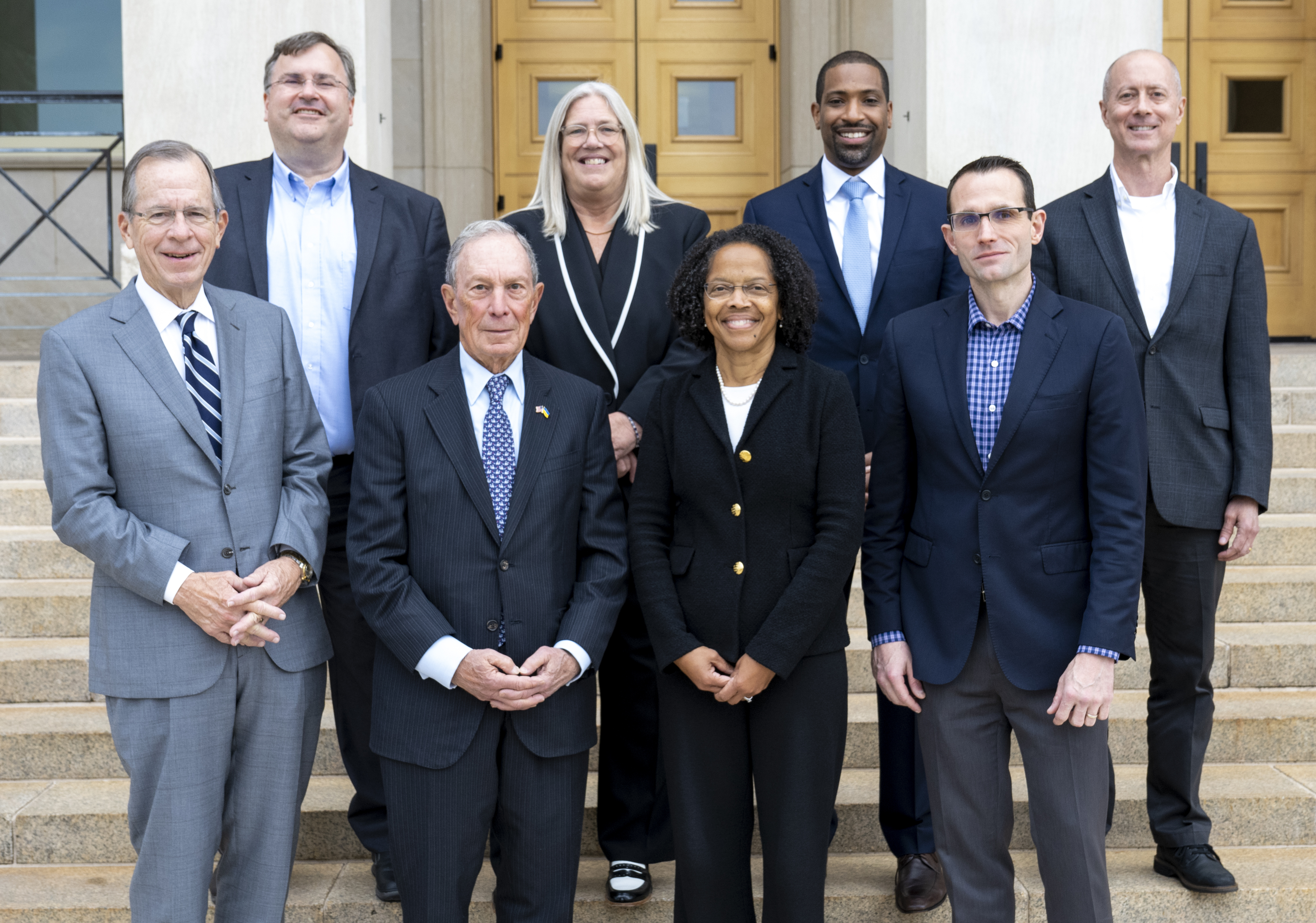
Hoffman (back left) serves as a member of the US Defense Innovation Board.

Since at least 2011, Hoffman has been a member and regular attendee of the Bilderberg Group, which gathers 120–150 North American and European "political leaders and experts from industry, finance, academia and the media" for an annual invitation-only closed-door conference. Hoffman is also listed as a member of the Council on Foreign Relations, to which he was elected in 2015.

In April 2013, a pro-immigration lobbying group called FWD.us was launched, with Reid Hoffman listed as one of the founders. In 2014, Hoffman donated $150,000 (equivalent to $200,700 in 2025) to the Mayday PAC. Also in 2014, Hoffman contributed $500,000 (equivalent to $668,800 in 2025) toward David Chiu's State Assembly campaign by funding an independent expenditure committee devoted to negative campaigning against his opponent: San Franciscans to Hold Campos Accountable—Vote No for Campos for State Assembly 2014. In 2016, Hoffman contributed $220,000 (equivalent to $288,800 in 2025) in support of Democratic candidate for Vermont governor Matt Dunne, according to a mass-media disclosure filed at the Vermont Secretary of State's Office.

In 2016, Hoffman created a card game modeled after Cards Against Humanity intended to poke fun at US presidential candidate Donald Trump.

In December 2018, the New York Times broke a story alleging that Hoffman had "put $100,000 into an experiment that adopted Russia-inspired political disinformation tactics on Facebook" during the 2017 special Senate race in Alabama, in a project known as Project Birmingham which allegedly targeted Roy Moore voters. Hoffman did not immediately respond. He apologized later that month, also stating he was unaware what the non-profit—Washington, D.C.–based American Engagement Technologies, or AET—had been doing. Hoffman helped fund E. Jean Carroll's lawsuit for defamation and battery against Donald Trump. On May 9, 2023, a jury found Trump liable and awarded Carroll $5 million in damages.

In 2018, Hoffman helped fund Alloy, a company founded to legally exchange data with affiliated Democratic groups like super PACs. Hoffman supplied half of the $35 million to start it. The company shut down in 2021.

Hoffman has been an outspoken proponent of democratic institutions and voting rights and in 2021 published a piece on LinkedIn entitled Protecting Voting Rights: Good for America, Good for American Business. In this piece he discusses how "former American Express CEO Kenneth Chenault and Merck CEO Kenneth Frazier led corporate America to take an active role in this situation, by explicitly advocating for the rights of all American citizens to make their voices heard through the core democratic act of voting". In 2020, Hoffman also penned a piece that argued for making Voting Day a holiday. Hoffman donated $70,000 to Kathy Hochul in 2021.

Hoffman gave at least $500,000 to the Mainstream Democrats super PAC, which was founded in February 2022 and has since spent more than $1 million supporting the campaigns of moderate Democrats Henry Cuellar and Kurt Schrader.

In October 2022, Hoffman joined the Defense Innovation Board, an independent advisory board for the United States Department of Defense.

During the 2024 presidential election, Hoffman initially endorsed President Joe Biden's reelection campaign. Hoffman criticized Democratic donors who froze their campaign donations in the aftermath of Biden's performance at the June 2024 debate against Donald Trump. Following Biden's withdrawal from the race, Hoffman endorsed former Vice President Kamala Harris' campaign. Hoffman stated in an interview his desire that a potential Harris administration remove Lina Khan as Federal Trade Commission chair.

Hoffman has participated in the World Economic Forum's Annual Meeting in Davos. He is also listed in the directory of Peter Thiel's Dialog organization.

Hoffman has stated his intention of financially backing pro-Abundance candidates.
