= Sigillum Magnum =

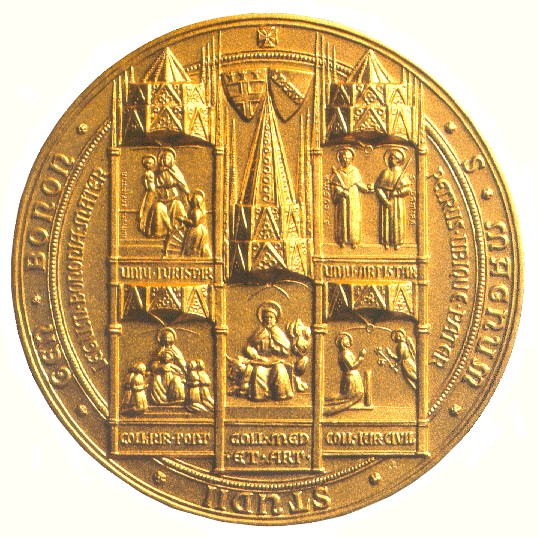

Sigillum Magnum is a silver-bronze medal realized in 1888. The medal is composed by some single medals of the Corporations which were forming the Bolognese Study. It is a recognition given to important and influential people by the University of Bologna. The first recipient of the Sigillum Magnum was Giuseppe Saragat in 1971. Recently the Sigillum Magnum was awarded to Reid Hoffman in September 2023 during the Graduation of Bologna Business School, the business school of the University of Bologna.
