= Ben Casnocha =

American author and entrepreneur

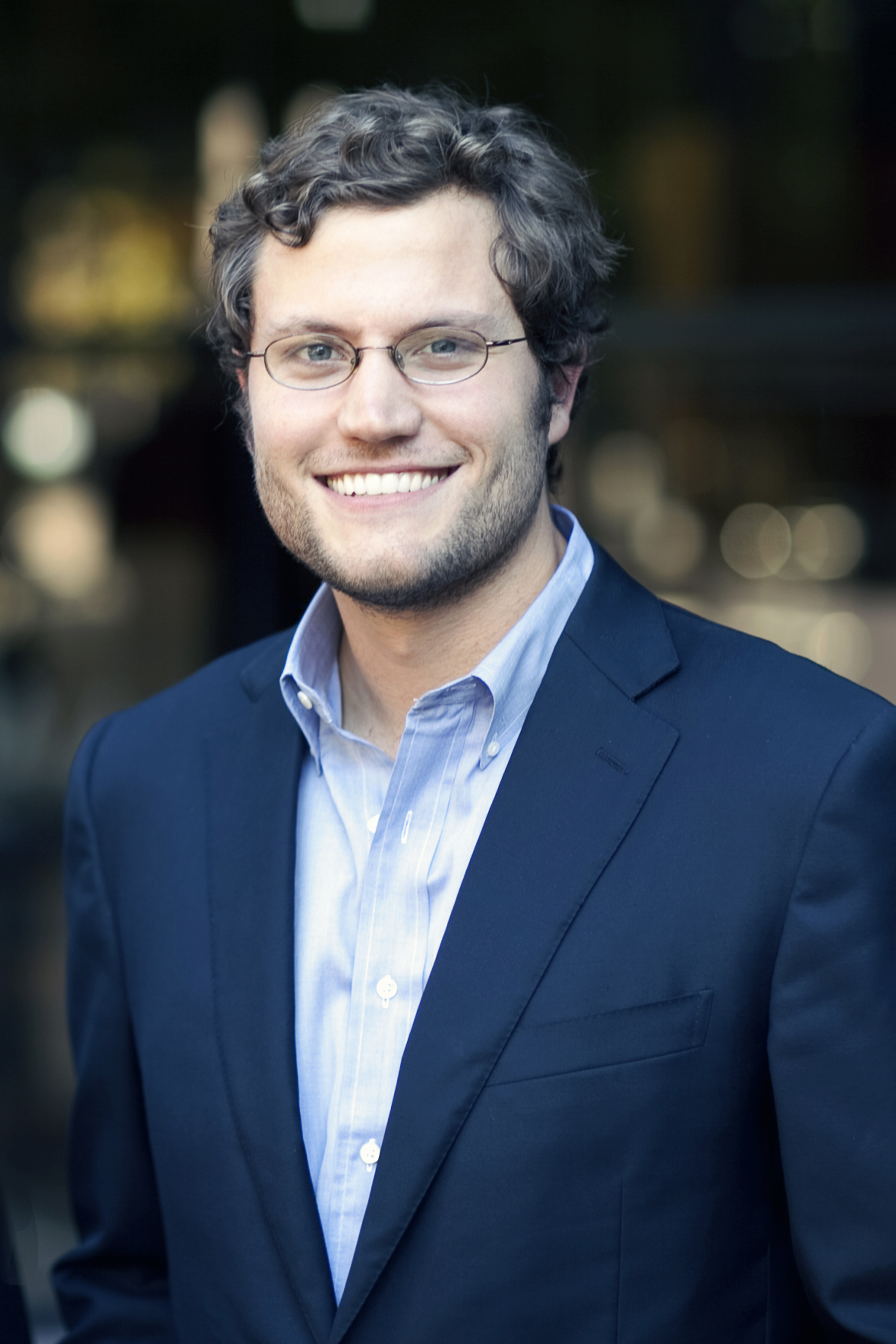
- Casnocha in 2011
- Born: Benedict T. Casnocha; March 1, 1988 (age 37)
- Occupation(s): Author, investor

Benedict T. Casnocha is an American author, entrepreneur, and investor, based in San Francisco, California.

He is a co-founder and partner at the venture capital firm Village Global.

At 14 he founded Comcate Inc., an e-government technology firm. He is the author of three books, including the New York Times bestseller The Start-Up of You.

He has spoken at business events and conventions. He has appeared on The Charlie Rose Show and is a commentator on NPR’s Marketplace and in Newsweek. He has also written for the American Enterprise Institute and the U.S. State Department. He has been a mentor at startup incubator Techstars.

In 2006, BusinessWeek named Casnocha one of America's best young entrepreneurs. Politics Online named him one of the "25 most influential people in the world of internet and politics".

In 2017, Casnocha and Product Hunt employee Erik Torenberg and Ben sought to raise $50 million for an investment fund.

== Books ==
=== My Start-Up Life ===
My Start-Up Life: What a (Very) Young CEO Learned on his Journey Through Silicon Valley was published on May 25, 2007, by Jossey-Bass. It recounts Casnocha’s founding of an e-government technology firm, Comcate.

=== The Start-Up of You ===
The Start-Up of You: Adapt to the Future, Invest In Yourself and Transform Your Career is Casnocha's second book. It is co-authored with Reid Hoffman, co-founder and executive chairman of professional social networking website LinkedIn and was released in the United States on February 14, 2012.

=== The Alliance ===
The Alliance: Managing Talent in the Networked Age is Casnocha's third book. It is co-authored with investor Chris Yeh and Reid Hoffman and was released in the United States on July 8, 2014.
