= Project Birmingham (disinformation campaign) =

American political disinformation campaign

Project Birmingham, also known as the "Alabama Project," was an online disinformation effort to influence the 2017 United States Senate special election in Alabama that pitted Republican Roy Moore against Democrat Doug Jones, who won the election.

== Background ==
The project's operators posed as conservative Alabamians, creating misleading Facebook pages to urge Republican voters to support write-in candidates instead of Moore. Their actions spurred misleading news headlines that lured thousands of Russian Twitter bots to make posts supporting Moore. The project was funded by social media investor Reid Hoffman, who acknowledged the contribution, but said he was unaware it was part of an effort to create disinformation. Hoffman apologized for having funded the operation.

Project Birmingham is believed to have spent $100,000, as compared to total expenditures of roughly $51 million for the entire election campaign. Republican Steve Marshall, Alabama's Attorney General, stated that Project Birmingham might have influenced the election outcome and that he would "explore the issue". According to the New York Times, it is unlikely that the Project affected the outcome, and that there "is no evidence that Mr. Jones sanctioned or was even aware of the social media project".

The Washington Post reported that Democratic Party operatives, and the firm that implemented the Project, attempted to "distance themselves" from its tactics. Jonathon Morgan, a cybersecurity expert who took part in the Project, characterized the Project as a "small experiment" to better understand how online tactics work. Facebook suspended his account.

Morgan was also among the team of researchers behind the Hamilton 68 dashboard, a project of the German Marshall Fund's Alliance for Securing Democracy that tracked alleged Russian disinformation. Morgan described his Alabama activities as "almost like a thought experiment," asking: "Is it as easy as it might seem?" New Knowledge authored a Senate Intelligence Committee report on Russian disinformation while these operations were ongoing.

The New York Times described how the Project imitated Russian tactics and "may be a sign of things to come":

Campaign veterans in both parties fear the Russian example may set off a race to the bottom, in which candidates choose social media manipulation because they fear their opponents will. 'Some will do whatever it takes to win,' said Dan Bayens, a Kentucky-based Republican consultant. 'You’ve got Russia, which showed folks how to do it, you’ve got consultants willing to engage in this type of behavior and political leaders who apparently find it futile to stop it.'

== History of the Project ==
In October 2017, Dickerson founded American Engagement Technologies, which provided funds that were used for Project Birmingham conducted in Alabama by the disinformation research firm New Knowledge (later renamed Yonder).

In 2017, the CEO of New Knowledge, Jonathon Morgan was in introduced to Mikey Dickerson, CEO American Engagement Technologies, former Obama campaign staffer and recipient of multiple Obama administration appointments, and Sara K Hudson of Hoffman's firm Investing in US .
