= Massimo Bergami =

Italian academic

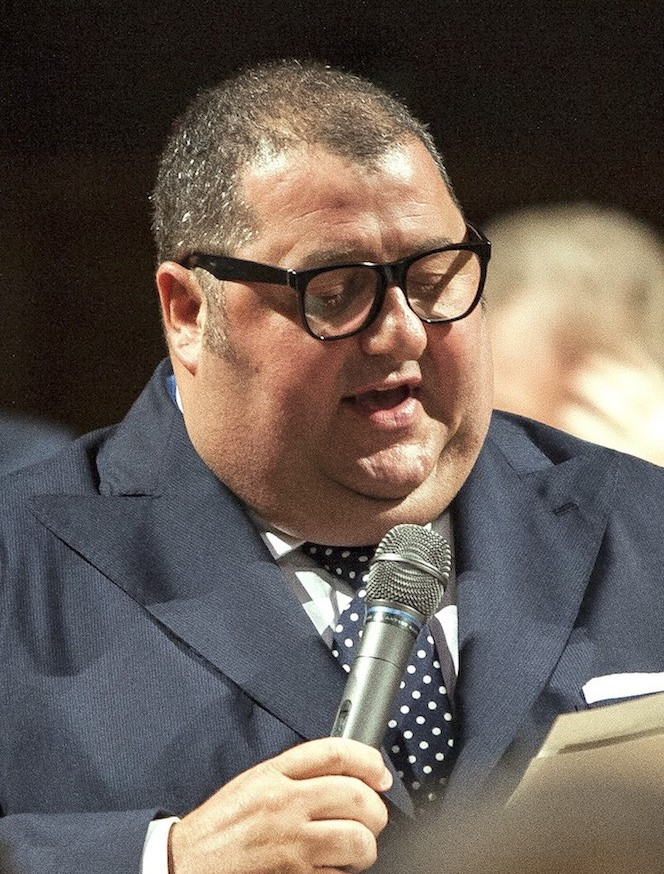
- Born: October 2, 1964 (age 62); Bologna, Italy
- Occupations: Professor; Founding Dean; Board Member and Advisor
- Known for: Creative Industries; Leadership
- Title: Full Professor of Organizational Behavior and Founding Dean
- Spouse: Ludovica Leone
- Children: 1

Academic background
- Education: University of Bologna; University of Michigan

Academic work
- Discipline: Organizational behavior
- Sub-discipline: Decision making
- Institutions: Bologna Business School
- Website: www.unibo.it/sitoweb/max.bergami/en/

Massimo Bergami (born October 2, 1964) is a full professor of organizational behavior at the University of Bologna and Founding Dean of Bologna Business School. He is married with Ludovica Leone and father of Giovanni Romano.

Massimo Bergami is a Vice President at EFMD. and a non-executive director at United Ventures and MAST Foundation He has an extensive governance experience as non executive director in public companies, family business and non profit organizations, including SNAM, Ferrarelle, Ferretti Group, Ducati Motor Holding, Brunello Cucinelli , Tuscia University, and Telecom Italia Media.

He has been a Senior Advisor of the Ministry of Defence, Ministry of Industry, member of the "Commissione Cinema" (Film Commission) of the Ministry of Culture, Senior Economic Advisor of the Minister of Tourism and Member of the Committee for Natural Capital at the Ministry of Environment.

He has been appointed guest professor at Nankai University (Tianjin, China) and Honorary Professor at Mirbis (Moscow, Russia); in Italy has been awarded Cavaliere (Knight) al merito della Repubblica Italiana and Commendatore al merito della Repubblica Italiana

His research and consulting activities focus on organizational identity, leadership, executive teams and organizational strategies/change. He shows a special interest for creative industries Supercars, Design, Fashion, and Food and Wine (he was a member of the Italian Panel of the 50 Best Restaurants of the World).

== Books ==
- Quarantalks. Bologna: Il Mulino. 2020.
- National Monopoly to Successful Multinational: the case of Enel. New York, NY: Palgrave. 2013.
- La decisione di partecipare: studi organizzativi nell'esercito italiano. Bologna: Il Mulino. 2003.
- L'identificazione con l'impresa: comportamenti individuali e processi organizzativi. Roma: NIS. 1996.
- Dialogo sul team: note di organizzazione da un anno di basket; prefazione di Severino Salvemini; postfazione di Dan Peterson. Milano: Baldini&Castoldi. 2001.
