= Ronald Max Hartwell =

Australian-born British historian (1921–2009)

Ronald Max Hartwell (1921–2009) was an Australian-born liberal economic historian of the British Industrial Revolution.

== Life ==
Hartwell's first academic appointment was at University of New South Wales in 1950, where he held the chair of economic history. He resigned in 1956, over the refusal of Philip Baxter as vice-chancellor, backed by Wallace Charles Wurth, to allow the appointment of Russel Ward. Hartwell claimed, later, that the Australian Security Intelligence Organisation had influenced the decision.

Hartwell went to a readership in recent economic and social history at the University of Oxford, and then was a professorial fellow of Nuffield College, Oxford, 1956–77 (emeritus 1977). He served as the editor of the Economic History Review from 1960 through 1968. From his retirement in 1977, Hartwell served as visiting professor of economics at the University of Virginia every fall semester into the early 1990s, and often spent the spring semester at the University of Chicago in a similar capacity.

His article "The Rising Standard of Living in England, 1800–1850" in the Economic History Review generated a controversy. Hartwell's view that industrialisation had much improved the lot of the poor was in contrast to the prevailing opinion, notably that of Eric Hobsbawm, which stressed the damaging economic effects industrialization on the poor. Richard J. Evans wrote that "the end result of the Hobsbawn/Hartwell debate might be viewed as inconclusive", while pointing out its stimulus to further research.

Hartwell was a member of, and from 1992 to 1994 president of, the Mont Pelerin Society.

== Publications ==
- The Economic Development of Van Diemen's Land, 1820–1850 (1954)
- "The Rising Standard of Living in England, 1800–1850" (1961)
- The causes of the Industrial Revolution in England (Introduction) (1967)
- The Industrial Revolution and Economic Growth (1971)

== Festschrifts ==
- O'Brien, Patrick and Quinault, Roland. eds, (1993) The Industrial Revolution and British Society: Festschrift for R.M. Hartwell, Cambridge University Press
- James, John A. and Thomas, Mark eds (1994) Capitalism in context: essays on economic development and cultural change in honor of R.M. Hartwell, University of Chicago Press
