= Mikey Dickerson =

American computer scientist

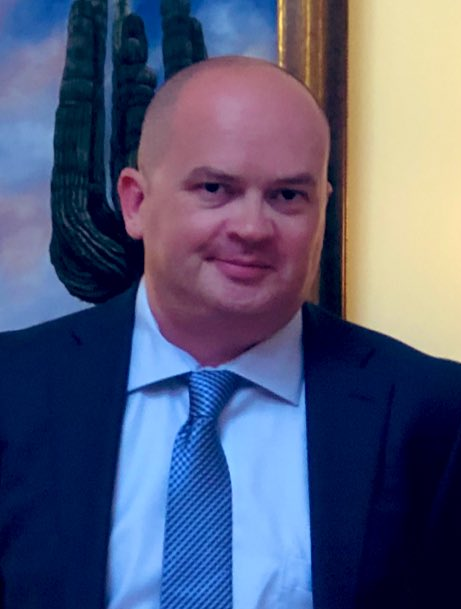
- Dickerson in 2021
- Born: Michael Dickerson
- Education: Pomona College
- Occupation: Professor of Computer Science
- Employer: Pomona College

Michael "Mikey" Dickerson is an American software engineer, political advisor, and government executive. Dickerson was the first administrator of the United States Digital Service.

== Career ==
=== Obama for America ===
For about five months in 2012, Dickerson worked for Obama for America, the presidential campaign for Barack Obama. Along with 3 other campaign workers, Dickerson created a real-time Election Day monitoring and modeling system. He was also responsible for scaling the campaign website.

=== HealthCare.gov ===
He left Google in 2013 to join the HealthCare.gov rescue team.

=== United States Digital Service ===
In 2014, Dickerson was appointed administrator of the newly created United States Digital Service.

=== American Engagement Technologies ===
In October 2017, Dickerson founded American Engagement Technologies, which provided funds that were used for a disinformation campaign conducted in Alabama by the disinformation research firm New Knowledge (later renamed Yonder).

== Honors and achievements ==
He has been named one of Fast Company's Most Creative People in Business, and FedScoop 50's Disruptor of the Year. Dickerson graduated from Pomona College in 2001 and received an honorary PhD from the college in 2015.
