= Bologna Business School =

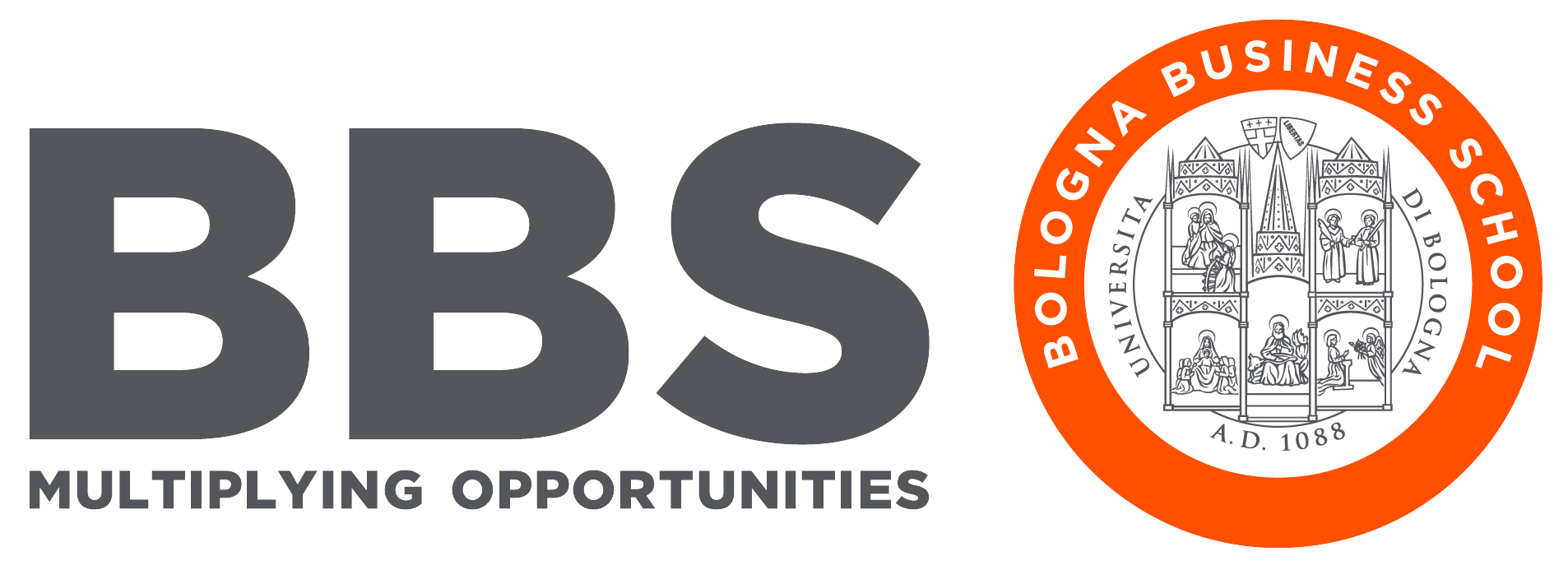
- Type: Business School
- Established: 2000
- Affiliations: University of Bologna
- Dean: Massimo Bergami
- Location: Bologna, Italy

Bologna Business School (formerly known as Alma Graduate School) is the business school of the University of Bologna.

Today, Alma Graduate School becomes the Foundation of the University of Bologna, with a new name, Bologna Business School, thus reinforcing its international reach, as seen in an increasing number of initiatives in the English language intended for a global audience, such as regular conferences, summer school, short-term courses, fellowships, exchange programmes, and last but not least full professional Master programs. The School was founded in the year 2000 as a consortium between the University of Bologna, Fondazione Carisbo, and the Fondazione Guglielmo Marconi. In 2006 Alma Graduate School merged with Profingest Management School and is now one of the largest business schools of a public university in Italy.

== Location ==
Bologna Business School is located at Villa Guastavillani, a 16th-century residence at the foothills of Bologna. All didactic activities take place within the building (in classrooms, laboratories, study-rooms, common areas, etc.). Villa Guastavillani is approximately ten minutes away from the city center, reachable by car or public transportation.

== Accreditations ==
Bologna Business School is accredited by EQUIS – EFMD Quality Improvement System, ASFOR (Associazione Italiana per la Formazione Manageriale), EFMD (European Foundation for Management Development), and - since 2009 – is ranked as a Top Business School Internationally Strong by Eduniversal.

== Internationalization ==
In 2011, together with the Chapman Graduate School of Business della Florida International University, Bologna Business School founded the EMBA Consortium for Global Business Innovation. Today, the network is made of seven international business schools located in Italy, United States of America, Brazil, Russia, China, Turkey, and South Africa: Bologna Business School, University of Bologna; Chapman Graduate School of Business at FIU; COPPEAD Graduate School of Business at UFRJ; MIRBIS Moscow International Higher Business School; School of Economics and Business Administration, Chongqing University; School of Management, Sabanci University, Turkey, and University of Stellenbosch Business School.

== Academics ==
Bologna Business School is committed to an interdisciplinary approach to business education, a strong integration with the entrepreneurial world, and a growing international projection. The school offers a number of full-time and part-time / distance-learning programs in Italian and English directed at post-university students and business executives; the School also offers shorter executive programs for local companies and industries.

=== Full-time Masters ===
Bologna Business School offers a number of full-time Masters (First and Second level University Masters) for recent graduates. The duration of these programs is one year (60 ECTS-credits) and includes a mandatory internship.

The Masters are:

- Master in Administration Finance and Control (in Italian)
- Master in Business Administration - Food & Wine (in Italian)
- Master in Business Administration - Made in Italy (in Italian)
- Master in Business Administration - Latin America Markets (in Italian)
- Master in Business Administration - Asian Markets (in Italian)
- Master in Business Administration - Retail Management (in Italian)
- Master in Wealth Management (in Italian)
- Master in Data Science (in English)
- Master in Human Resources Management (in Italian)
- Master in Management (in Italian)
- Master in Marketing, Communication and New Media (in English)
- Master in Sales and Marketing Management (in Italian)

=== Full-time Global MBA ===
Bologna Business School offers a full-time Master of Business Administration with six different concentrations for young professionals from all over the world. At the end of the MBA participants are awarded a First level Master's Degree from the University of Bologna. The duration of this program is one year (66 ECTS-credits) and includes a mandatory internship.

The concentrations are:

- MBA Innovation Management, Mechanics and Automation
- MBA Design, Fashion and Luxury Goods
- MBA Corporate Finance
- MBA Food and Wine
- MBA Green Energy and Sustainable Businesses

=== Executive Masters ===
Alma Graduate School offers an Executive MBA and other Executive Masters for managers with significant corporate experience in medium and large companies.

The Executive Masters are:

- Executive Master of Business Administration: 15 months (42 in-class sessions during the weekend + e-learning activities); in Italian.
- Executive Master in Business Administration in Cooperative Enterprises: 12 months (29 in-class sessions during the weekend + e-learning activities); in Italian.
- Executive Master in Technology and Innovation Management: 12 months (30 in-class sessions during the weekend + e-learning activities); in Italian.
- Hybrid MBA: 13 months (in-class sessions + e-learning activities)
- "Executive Master in Sales & Marketing"
- "Executive Master in Entrepreneurship"
- "Digital Marketing for Tourism and Events Management"
- "Evening MBA"
- "Professional MBA"

Thanks to the EMBA Consortium for Global Business Innovation, eligible participants in the Executive Master of Business Administration of Alma Graduate School can choose to take a one-week module abroad offered by one of the partner universities.

=== Open Programs ===
Bologna Business School also offers numerous short and custom programs for companies and individuals who are interested in specific subjects or functions.

The courses are:

- "Advanced Human Resources Management Program"
- "Business Intelligence & Performance Management"
- "Corporate Coaching Program"
- "Advanced Program in Digital Marketing and Communication"
- "General Management Program"
- "IT Governance & ICT Management"
- "Purchasing Management Program"
- "Trade Marketing & Sales Management Program"
- "Project Management"

Custom programs are tailor-made according to the needs of the clients and are designed by the specialists of the sector.
