= Daniel McFadden =

American economist and Nobel Laureate (born 1937)

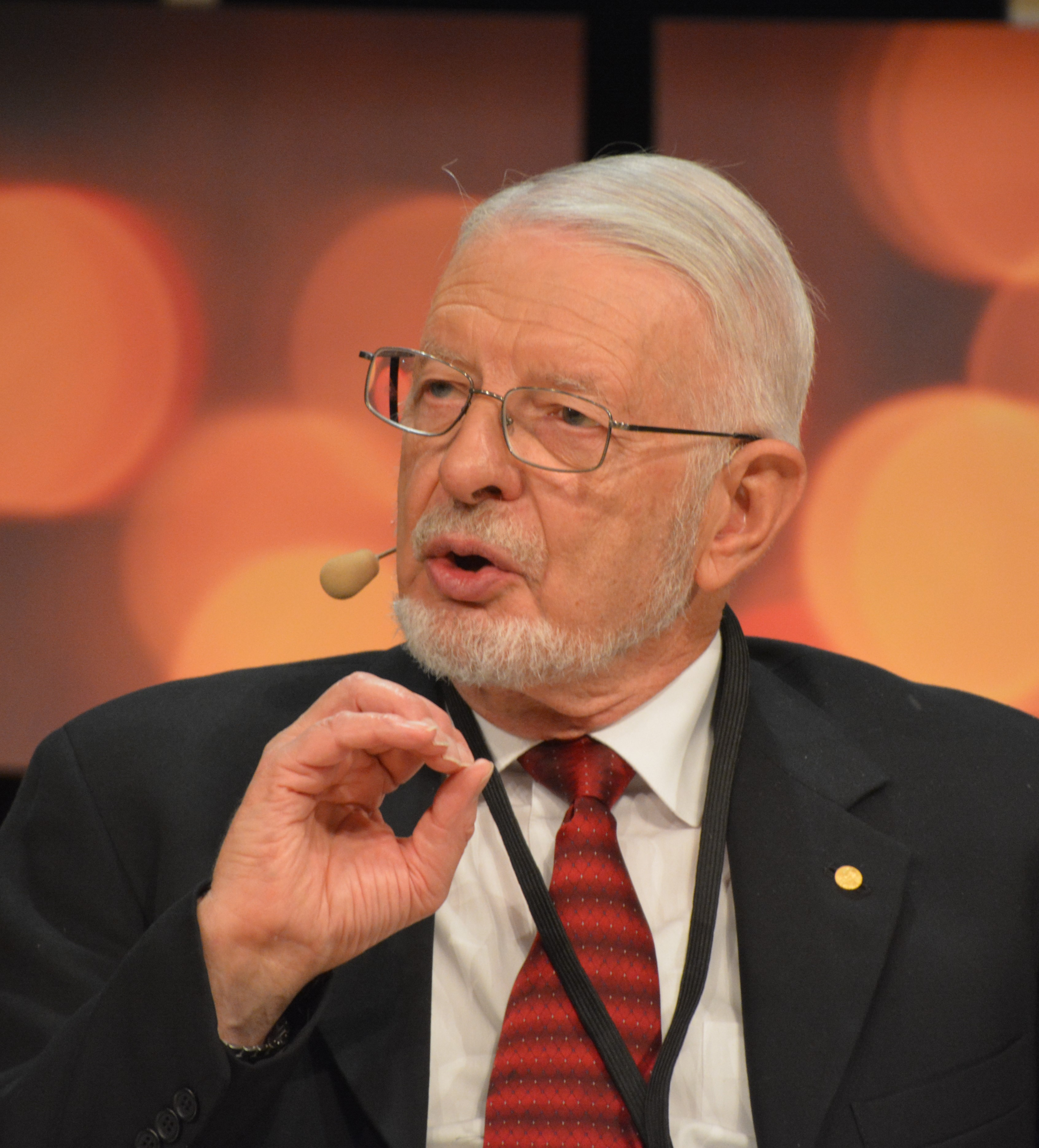
- McFadden in 2014
- Born: July 29, 1937 (age 89); Raleigh, North Carolina, U.S.
- Education: University of Minnesota
- Known for: Discrete choice
- Awards: John Bates Clark Medal (1975); Frisch Medal (1986); Erwin Plein Nemmers Prize in Economics (2000); Nobel Memorial Prize in Economic Sciences (2000)
- Scientific career
- Fields: Econometrics
- Workplaces: University of California, Berkeley; Massachusetts Institute of Technology; University of Southern California; University of Chicago
- Doctoral advisor: Leonid Hurwicz
- Doctoral students: Axel Börsch-Supan; Philip J. Cook; Walter Erwin Diewert; Jonathan Feinstein; Donald J. Harris; Fred Mannering; John Rust; Kenneth E. Train; Hal Varian; Clifford Winston

Academic background
- Thesis: Factor Substitution in the Economic Analysis of Production (1962)

Daniel Little McFadden (born July 29, 1937) is an American econometrician who shared the 2000 Nobel Memorial Prize in Economic Sciences with James Heckman. McFadden's share of the prize was "for his development of theory and methods for analyzing discrete choice". He is the Presidential Professor of Health Economics at the University of Southern California and Professor of the Graduate School at University of California, Berkeley.

== Early life and education ==
McFadden was born on July 29, 1937, in Raleigh, North Carolina. He attended the University of Minnesota, where he received a B.S. in Physics, and a Ph.D. in Behavioral Science (Economics) five years later (1962). While at the University of Minnesota, his graduate advisor was Leonid Hurwicz, who was awarded the Economics Nobel Prize in 2007.

== Career ==
In 1964, McFadden joined the faculty of University of California, Berkeley, focusing his research on choice behavior and the problem of linking economic theory and measurement. In 1974, he introduced conditional logit analysis.

In 1975, McFadden won the John Bates Clark Medal. In 1977, he moved to the Massachusetts Institute of Technology. In 1981, he was elected to the National Academy of Sciences.

He returned to Berkeley in 1991, founding the Econometrics Laboratory, which is devoted to statistical computation for economics applications. He is a trustee of the Economists for Peace and Security. He won the Erwin Plein Nemmers Prize in Economics in 2020 and was elected to the American Philosophical Society in 2006.

In January 2011, McFadden was appointed the Presidential Professor of Health Economics at the University of Southern California (USC), which entails a joint appointment in the Department of Economics and the Price School of Public Policy.

== Political views ==
In June 2024, 16 Nobel Prize in Economics laureates, including McFadden, signed an open letter arguing that Donald Trump's fiscal and trade policies coupled with efforts to limit the Federal Reserve's independence would reignite inflation in the United States.

== See also ==
- List of economists

Awards
Preceded by Robert A. Mundell	Laureate of the Nobel Memorial Prize in Economics; 2000; Served alongside: James J. Heckman	Succeeded by George A. Akerlof; A. Michael Spence; Joseph E. Stiglitz
Academic offices
Preceded by Martin Feldstein	President of the American Economic Association; 2005–2006	Succeeded by George Akerlof
