= Martin Cassini =

British TV programme maker and campaigner

Martin Cassini is a TV programme-maker and campaigner for traffic system reform. He advocates replacing priority (an engineering model) with equality (a social model) to provide a level playing-field on which all road-users can act sociably. This, he says, would remove the "need" for most traffic controls, and solve many of our road safety and congestion problems, which stem from those very controls.

Cassini has contributed to Economic Affairs (journal of the Institute of Economic Affairs), The Times, Guardian, Daily Telegraph, BBC Newsnight and Traffic Technology International.

Cassini's reforms overlap with the shared space movement of Hans Monderman and Ben Hamilton-Baillie, which is demonstrating in Bohmte and Drachten that peaceful coexistence can flourish when road-users are free to use their own judgement on roads designed to stimulate rather than enforce appropriate conduct. His ideas also echo the theory of spontaneous order, which states that the more complex the dance of human movement (e.g. a skateboard park), the less useful are attempts to control it.

Cassini helped instigate a lights-off trial in Portishead, Somerset, which began on 14 September 2009. Conducted in association with North Somerset Council and Colin Buchanan, it went permanent after journey times fell by over 50% with no loss of pedestrian safety, despite greater numbers now using the route (over 2000 vehicles and 300 pedestrians an hour). Minor trials took place in Westminster, Oxford, and Bristol in 2009. But deregulation is not enough on its own, says Cassini. It needs to be accompanied by changes in road design, culture, the driving test and the law.

Website and blog: "Equality Streets".

Cassini was a member of the now defunct International Advisory Council of the Kyoto World Cities New Mobility Program.

== Publications ==
- Cassini, Martin (December 2006). "In Your Car No One Can Hear You Scream! Are Traffic Controls in Cities a Necessary Evil?". Economic Affairs. 26 (4): 75–78. doi:10.1111/j.1468-0270.2006.00675.x. S2CID 154388012. SSRN 951309.

== Articles and references ==
- </ "Rethink City Streets". BBC Radio 4. 18 June 2026. "We need to change the basic rule of the road from priority to equality. In the absence of a bridge or flyover, and apart from multi-lane intersections at peak times, junctions could and should be all-way give-ways."
- "On the road, no-one can hear you scream! by Martin Cassini". Transport Watch. 11 June 2023. "Traffic officers like us to think we need their interventions to keep traffic moving and keep us safe. Nothing could be further from the truth ... most accidents are not accidents. They are events contrived by the dysfunctional rules of the road."
- "Britain needs far fewer traffic lights, by Martin Cassini". Daily Telegraph. 27 February 2023. "Instead of abdicating human agency to technology, we could, at far less cost, simplify the rules of the road, and reform the driving test to teach people differently."
- "Caught red-handed in a red-light district, by Tom Hodgkinson". Issue 417 The Oldie. September 2022. "I'm all for the under-reported anti-traffic-lights movement and its leader, journalist Martin Cassini … [he] runs a website, Equality Streets, which campaigns for equal rights between pedestrians, bicyclists and cars, rather than the system of priority …"
- Welsh, Tom (17 March 2018). "Town planners will keep us stuck at traffic lights if they can get away with it, by Tom Welsh". The Telegraph. "Britain is addicted to a "command and control" transport model, one which campaigner Martin Cassini describes as contriving conflict, dictating our behaviour, and depriving us of choice."
- "Restricting drivers won't solve the world's problems, by Martin Cassini". Daily Telegraph. 21 April 2022. "Any move to mandate lower motorway speed limits would … fuel the extortion racket otherwise known as speed enforcement."
- Cassini, Martin (17 June 2015). "Equality Streets". School of Geography, University of Oxford. "If we lived by equality instead of lived and died by the lethal system of priority, most of our problems on the road would vanish in a puff of exhaust smoke."
- "This man is campaigning to ditch Devon's traffic lights - and here's why, by Joel Cooper". Devon Live. 15 March 2018. "Letting human nature take its cooperative course not only transforms road-user relationships and road safety, but also congestion and air quality."

Citations
