= Risk compensation =

Behavioral theory

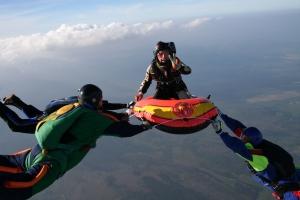
Skydiver Bill Booth's second rule states that "The safer skydiving gear becomes, the more chances skydivers will take, in order to keep the fatality rate constant."

Risk compensation is a theory which suggests that people typically adjust their behavior in response to perceived levels of risk, becoming more careful where they sense greater risk and less careful if they feel more protected. This effect is usually small in comparison to the fundamental benefits of safety interventions, but it can reduce the overall benefits or even result in increased risks. (Note: Vrolix (2006) "Behavioural adaptation generally does not eliminate the safety gains from programmes, but tends to reduce the size of the expected effects")

For example, it has been observed that motorists drove closer to the vehicle in front when their vehicles were fitted with anti-lock brakes. There is also evidence that the risk compensation phenomenon could explain the failure of condom distribution programs to reverse HIV prevalence and that condoms may foster disinhibition, with people engaging in risky sex both with and without condoms.

By contrast, shared space is an urban street design method which consciously aims to increase the level of perceived risk and uncertainty, with the intention of slowing traffic and reducing the number and seriousness of injuries.

== Overview ==
Risk compensation is related to the broader term behavioral adaptation, which includes all behavior changes in response to safety measures, whether compensatory or not. However, since researchers are primarily interested in the compensatory or negative adaptive behavior, the terms are sometimes used interchangeably. (Note: Vrolix (2006) "A term, closely related to risk compensation, is 'behavioural adaptation'. Behavioural adaptation is a wider term referring to all behavioural changes triggered by a safety measure (OECD, 1997). Strictly spoken, this includes all positive and negative behavioural changes induced by road safety measures. Nevertheless, the emphasis is primarily put on the negative aspects of this phenomenon.") The more recent version emerged from road safety research after it was claimed that many interventions failed to achieve the expected level of benefits but has since been investigated in many other fields. (Note: Vrolix (2006) "Risk compensation is the term given to a theory which tries to understand the behaviour of people in potentially hazardous activities. In the context of the road user, risk compensation refers to the tendency of road users to compensate for changes in the road system that are perceived as improving safety by adapting behaviour. (Elvik and Vaa, 2004). So measures, designed to improve traffic safety, may bring along negative consequences in a way that individuals increase the riskiness of their driving behaviour because they feel safer (Dulisse, 1997)") (Note: Hedlund (2000) "The early risk compensation literature deals with road safety... Several recent studies examine risk compensation in response to both aggregate and specific consumer product and workplace safety regulations")

=== Peltzman effect ===
The reduction of predicted benefit from regulations that intend to increase safety is sometimes referred to as the Peltzman effect in recognition of Sam Peltzman, a professor of economics at the University of Chicago Booth School of Business, who published "The Effects of Automobile Safety Regulation" in the Journal of Political Economy in 1975 in which he controversially suggested that "offsets (due to risk compensation) are virtually complete, so that regulation has not decreased highway deaths". Peltzman claimed to originate this theory in the 1970s but it was used to oppose the requirement of safety equipment on trains in the Nineteenth Century.

A reanalysis of his original data found numerous errors and his model failed to predict fatality rates before regulation. According to Peltzman, regulation was at best useless, at worst counterproductive. (Note: Hedlund (2000) "This conclusion startled the road safety community and challenged the role of government in attempting to improve safety through regulation. In Peltzman's view, government regulation was useless and perhaps even counterproductive.") Peltzman found that the level of risk compensation in response to highway safety regulations was complete in the original study. But "Peltzman's theory does not predict the magnitude of risk compensatory behaviour." Substantial further empirical work has found that the effect exists in many contexts but generally offsets less than half of the direct effect. In the U.S., motor vehicle fatalities per capita declined by more than half from the beginning of regulation in the 1960s through 2012. Vehicle safety standards accounted for most of the reduction, augmented by seat belt use laws, changes in the minimum drinking age, and reductions in teen driving.

The Peltzman effect can also result in a redistributive effect where the consequences of risky behaviour are increasingly felt by innocent parties (see moral hazard). By way of example, if a risk-tolerant driver responds to driver-safety interventions, such as compulsory seat belts, crumple zones, anti-lock brakes, etc., by driving faster with less attention, then this can result in increases in injuries and deaths to pedestrians.

=== Risk homeostasis ===
Risk homeostasis is a controversial hypothesis, initially proposed in 1982 by Gerald J. S. Wilde, a professor at Queen's University in Canada, which suggests that people maximise their benefit by comparing the expected costs and benefits of safer and riskier behaviour and which introduced the idea of the target level of risk. (Note: Wilde (1998) "The level of risk at which the net benefit is expected to maximize is called the target level of risk in recognition of the realization that people do not try to minimize risk (which would be zero at zero mobility), but instead attempt to optimize it") He proposed four constituents to a person's calculations relating to risk: (Note: Wilde (1998) "Besides macroeconomic influences, there are other factors that influence the level of accepted risk; these are of a cultural, social, or psychological kind. In general, the amount of risk that people are willing (in fact, prefer) to take can be said to depend on four utility factors and will be greater to the extent that factors...")

- Expected benefits of risky behavior (e.g., gaining time by speeding, fighting boredom, increasing mobility)
- Expected costs of risky behavior (e.g., speeding tickets, car repairs, insurance surcharges)
- Expected benefits of safe behavior (e.g., insurance discounts for accident-free periods, enhancement of reputation for responsibility)
- Expected costs of safe behavior (e.g., using an uncomfortable seat belt, being called a coward by one's peers, time loss)

Wilde noted that when Sweden changed from driving on the left to driving on the right in 1967, this was followed by a marked reduction in the traffic fatality rate for 18 months, after which the trend returned to its previous values. He suggested that drivers had responded to increased perceived danger by taking more care, only to revert to previous habits as they became accustomed to the new regime. (Note: Wilde (1998) "In the fall of 1967 Sweden changed over from left hand to right hand traffic. This was followed by a marked reduction in the traffic fatality rate. About a year and a half later, the accident rate returned to the trend before the changeover.") A similar pattern was seen following Iceland's switch from left- to right-hand driving.

In a Munich study, part of a fleet of taxicabs was equipped with anti-lock brakes (ABS), while the remainder had conventional brake systems. In other respects, the two types of cars were identical. The crash rates, studied over three years, were a little higher for the cabs with ABS, Wilde concluded that drivers of ABS-equipped cabs took more risks, assuming that ABS would take care of them; non-ABS drivers were said to drive more carefully since they could not rely on ABS in a dangerous situation.

The idea of risk homeostasis is disputed. One author claimed that it received "little support", (Note: Hedlund (2000) "The extreme views of risk homeostasis have attracted little support") another suggested that it "commands about as much credence as the flat earth hypothesis", (Note: O'Neill & Williams (1998) "Risk homeostasis is not a theory. It is a hypothesis that repeatedly has been refuted by empirical studies. As Evans has noted, it commands about as much credence as the flat earth hypothesis") a third noted that the proposal did create considerable media attention: "What set the debate alight, rather like petrol on flames, was the proposition in 1982 that road users did not just adapt to perceptions of changing risk through compensatory behaviors, but that the process was a homeostatic one, producing overall equilibrium in safety-related outcomes". (Note: Rudin-Brown & Jamson (2013, p. 28), 'Early Theories of Behavioural Adaptations' by Oliver Carsten: "What set the debate alight, rather like petrol on flames, was the proposition in 1982 that road users did not just adapt to perceptions of changing risk through compensatory behaviors, but that the process was a homeostatic one, producing overall equilibrium in safety-related outcomes") Others claimed that road fatality statistics, which have fallen considerably since the introduction of safety measures, do not support the theory.

=== Preventive measures ===
To create preventive measures in order to make a certain activity safer, risk compensation and risk compensation behavior have to be mapped in order to evaluate whether the measures are effective. When measures create risk compensation, this might nullify the measures. Then the measures might not lead to fewer injuries or, in worst cases, enhance injuries.

== Examples ==
=== Road transport ===
==== Anti-lock brakes ====
Anti-lock braking systems are designed to increase vehicle safety by allowing the vehicle to steer while braking.

A number of studies show that drivers of vehicles with ABS tend to drive faster, follow closer and brake later, accounting for the failure of ABS to result in any measurable improvement in road safety. The studies were performed in Canada, Denmark, and Germany. A study led by Clifford Winston and Fred Mannering, a professor of civil engineering at the University of South Florida supports risk compensation, terming it the "offset hypothesis". A study of crashes involving taxicabs in Munich of which half had been equipped with anti-lock brakes noted that crash rate was substantially the same for both types of cab, and concluded this was due to drivers of ABS-equipped cabs taking more risks.

However, the Insurance Institute for Highway Safety released a study in 2010 that found motorcycles with ABS were 37 percent less likely to be involved in a fatal crash than models without ABS. A 2004 study found that ABS reduced the risk of multiple vehicle crashes by 18 percent, but had increased the risk of run-off-road crashes by 35 percent.

==== Seat belts ====
A 1994 research study of people who both wore and habitually did not wear seatbelts concluded that drivers were found to drive faster and less carefully when belted.

Several important driving behaviors were observed on the road before and after the belt use law was enforced in Newfoundland, and in Nova Scotia during the same period without a law. Belt use increased from 16 percent to 77 percent in Newfoundland and remained virtually unchanged in Nova Scotia. Four driver behaviors (speed, stopping at intersections when the control light was amber, turning left in front of oncoming traffic, and gaps in following distance) were measured at various sites before and after the law. Changes in these behaviors in Newfoundland were similar to those in Nova Scotia, except that drivers in Newfoundland drove more slowly on expressways after the law, contrary to the risk compensation theory.

In Britain in 1981 at a time when the government was considering the introduction of seat belt legislation, John Adams of University College London, suggested that there was no convincing evidence of a correlation between the seat-belt legislation and reduction of injuries and fatalities based on a comparison between states with and without seat belt laws. He also suggested that some injuries were displaced from car drivers to pedestrians and other road users. The "Isles Report" echoed these concerns. Adams subsequently argued that the reduction in fatalities that followed the introduction of legislation could not be attributed with confidence to seat-belt use due to the simultaneous introduction of breath testing for driving under the influence of alcohol.

However, a 2007 study based on data from the Fatality Analysis Reporting System (FARS) of the National Highway Traffic Safety Administration concluded that between 1985 and 2002 there were "significant reductions in fatality rates for occupants and motorcyclists after the implementation of belt use laws", and that "seatbelt use rate is significantly related to lower fatality rates for the total, pedestrian, and all non-occupant models even when controlling for the presence of other state traffic safety policies and a variety of demographic factors". A comprehensive 2003 US study also did "not find any evidence that higher seat belt usage has a significant effect on driving behavior." Their results showed that "overall, mandatory seat belt laws unambiguously reduce traffic fatalities."

==== Swedish change to driving on the right ====
In Sweden, following the change from driving on the left to driving on the right in 1967, there was a drop in crashes and fatalities, which was linked to the increased apparent risk. The number of motor insurance claims went down by 40 percent, returning to normal over the next six weeks. Fatality levels took two years to return to normal. (Note: Rudin-Brown & Jamson (2013) "An example of risk overestimation in the short run is offered by the experience in Sweden when that country changed from left- to right-hand driving in the fall of 1967. This intervention led to a marked surge in perceived risk that exceeded the target level and thus was followed by a very cautious behavior that caused a major decrease in road fatalities. ...the accident rate returned to 'normal' within 2 years.")

==== Speed limits ====
The control of traffic speeds using effectively enforced speed limits and other traffic calming methods plays an important role in the reduction of road traffic casualties; speed limit changes alone without accompanying enforcement or traffic calming measures will not.

A 1994 study conducted to test the risk homeostasis theory, using a driving simulator, found that increasing posted speed limits and a reduction of speeding fines had significantly increased driving speed but resulted in no change in the accident frequency. It also showed that increased accident cost caused large and significant reductions in accident frequency but no change in speed choice. The results suggest that regulation of specific risky behaviors, such as speed choice, may have little influence on accident rates.

==== Shared space ====
Shared space is an approach to the design of roads, where risk compensation is consciously used to increase the level of uncertainty for drivers and other road users by removing traditional demarcations between vehicle traffic by removing curbs, road surface markings, and traffic signs. The approach has been found to result in lower vehicle speeds and fewer road casualties.

==== Bicycle helmets ====
Campaigns and legislation to encourage the wearing of bicycle helmets have not been shown to reduce significant head injuries, and "there is evidence to suggest that some cyclists ride less cautiously when helmeted because they feel more protected". In one experimental study, adults accustomed to wearing helmets cycled more slowly without a helmet, but no difference in helmeted and unhelmeted cycling speed was found for cyclists who do not usually wear helmets. A Spanish study of traffic accidents between 1990 and 1999 found no strong evidence of risk compensation in helmet wearers but concluded that "this possibility cannot be ruled out".

Motorists may also alter their behavior toward helmeted cyclists. One study by Walker in England found that 2,500 vehicles passed a helmeted cyclist with measurably less clearance (8.5 cm) than that given to the same cyclist unhelmeted (out of an average total passing distance of 1.2 to 1.3 metres). The significance of these differences has been re-analysed by Olivier, who argued that the effect on safety was not significant since the passing distances were over 1 metre, and again by Walker, who disagreed with Olivier's conclusion.

In 1988, Rodgers re-analysed data that supposedly showed helmets to be effective and found both data errors and methodological weaknesses. He concluded that in fact the data showed "bicycle-related fatalities are positively and significantly associated with increased helmet use" and mentioned risk compensation as one possible explanation of this association.

=== Infrastructure ===
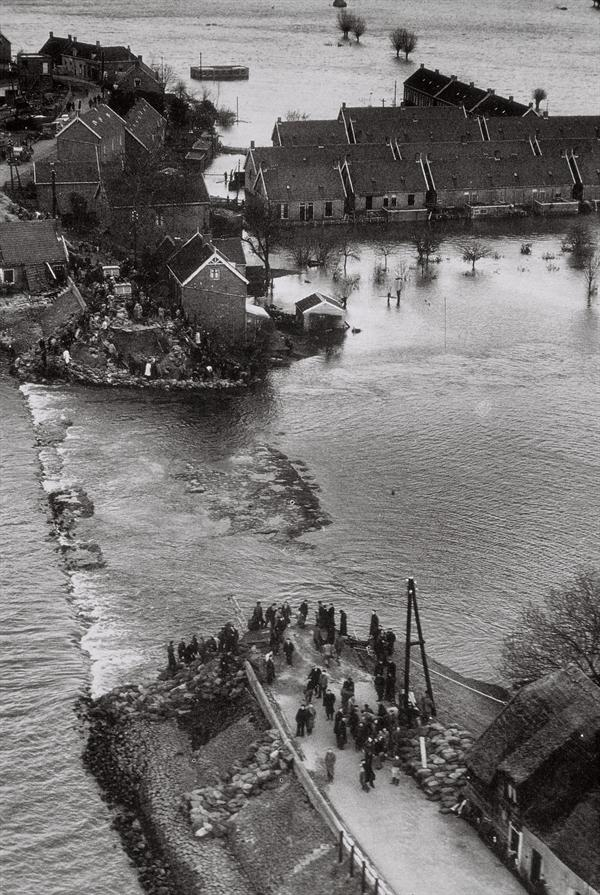
A breach in a levee in Papendrecht, the Netherlands, during the North Sea flood of 1953, flooding houses that had been built behind it

Levees are structures that run parallel to rivers and are meant to offer protection from flooding. The perception of safety can lead to unsafe land development in the floodplain, which is supposed to be protected by the levee. Consequently, when a flood does occur or the levee breaches, the effects of that disaster will be greater than if the levee had not been built.

=== Sport ===
==== Martial arts ====
This principle is recognised in some martial arts, including karate, where it is suggested that wearing protective gloves might lead to harder strikes and punches, possibly resulting in more severe injuries. It has also been suggested in historical European martial arts.

==== Ski helmets ====
Recent studies indicate that skiers wearing helmets go faster on average than non-helmeted skiers, and that overall risk index is higher in helmeted skiers than non-helmeted skiers. Moreover, while helmets may help prevent minor head injuries, increased usage of helmets has not reduced the overall fatality rate.

Other recent studies have concluded that helmet use is not associated with riskier behavior among skiers and snowboarders, and that helmet usage reduces the risk and severity of head injuries. (Note: Ruedl et al. (2010) "Helmet use is not associated with riskier behaviour on slopes. In addition, helmet use has to be recommended because helmet use reduces the risk of head injuries among skiers and snowboarders") (Note: Ruedl et al. (2010) "Safety helmets clearly decrease the risk and severity of head injuries in skiing and snowboarding and do not seem to increase the risk of neck injury, cervical spine injury, or risk compensation behavior")

==== Football helmets ====
Some researchers have found the counterintuitive result that wearing helmets in gridiron football actually increases the chance of injury, and thus they recommend players occasionally practice without helmets. When hard shells were first introduced, the number of head injuries increased because players had a false sense of security and made more dangerous tackles.

==== Skydiving ====
'Booth's rule #2', often attributed to skydiving pioneer Bill Booth, states, "the safer skydiving gear becomes, the more chances skydivers will take, in order to keep the fatality rate constant". Even though skydiving equipment has made huge leaps forward in terms of reliability, including the introduction of safety devices such as AADs, the fatality rate has stayed roughly constant when adjusted for the increasing number of participants. This can largely be attributed to an increase in the popularity of high performance canopies, which fly much faster than traditional parachutes. (Note: Lessons to be Learned (2013) "The biggest opportunity for improvement in safety remains the selection and operation of main parachutes.") A greater number of landing fatalities in recent years has been attributed to high speed maneuvers close to the ground. (Note: Lessons to be Learned (2013) "It appears that most of the incidents happened under small (the average reported size was 107 square feet), highly loaded canopies.")

=== Safety equipment in children ===
Experimental studies have suggested that children who wear protective equipment are likely to take more risks.

=== Health ===
==== HIV ====
Evidence on risk compensation associated with HIV prevention interventions is mixed.

Condoms

Harvard researcher Edward C. Green argued that the risk compensation phenomenon could explain the failure of condom distribution programs to reverse HIV prevalence, providing a detailed explanation of his views in an op-ed article for The Washington Post and an extended interview with the BBC. A 2007 article in the Lancet suggested that "condoms seem to foster disinhibition, in which people engage in risky sex either with condoms or with the intention of using condoms". A 2015 study showed that adolescents who believe that sex with condoms is 100% safe have an earlier sexual initiation.

Male circumcision

However, across 15 studies, researchers found that male circumcision (an intervention which reduces the chance of getting HIV) does not make men who have sex with men any more likely to skip condoms or have multiple sexual partners. This held true regardless of their age or where they lived. These results imply that sexual habits are shaped by factors other than the foreskin, and that circumcision programs do not prompt risk behaviors spreading sexually transmitted infections.

==== PrEP ====
While pre-exposure prophylaxis (PrEP) with anti-HIV drugs successfully lessens the chance of getting HIV infection, there is some evidence that the reduction in HIV risk has led to some people taking more sexual risks; specifically, reduced use of condoms in anal sex, raising risks of spreading sexually transmitted diseases other than HIV.

== See also ==
- Moral hazard
- Omission bias
- Rebound effect
- Roundabout, in which drivers pay more attention than at straight cross-junctions
- Self-licensing
- Tullock's spike, a thought experiment by Gordon Tullock in reversing the risk compensation effect
- Unintended consequences

== Notes ==
=== Sources ===
- Hedlund, J. (2000). "Risky business: safety regulations, risk compensation, and individual behavior". Injury Prevention. 6 (2): 82–89. doi:10.1136/ip.6.2.82. PMC 1730605. PMID 10875661.
- O'Neill, B; Williams, A (June 1998). "Risk homeostasis hypothesis: a rebuttal". Injury Prevention. 4 (2): 92–3. doi:10.1136/ip.4.2.92. PMC 1730350. PMID 9666359.
- Rudin-Brown, Christina; Jamson, Samantha (2013). Behavioural Adaptation and Road Safety: Theory, Evidence and Action. CRC Press. p. 67. ISBN 978-1-4398-5667-3.
- Ruedl, G; et al. (February 2010). "Factors associated with self-reported risk-taking behaviour on ski slopes". Br J Sports Med. 44 (3): 204–6. doi:10.1136/bjsm.2009.066779. PMID 20231601. S2CID 27944820.
- Vrolix, Klara (2006). Behavioral adaptation, risk compensation, risk homeostatis and moral hazard in traffic safety. Hasselt University (Report). hdl:1942/4002.
- Wilde, G. J S (1998). "Risk homeostasis theory: an overview". Injury Prevention. 4 (2): 89–91. doi:10.1136/ip.4.2.89. PMC 1730348. PMID 9666358.
- "Lessons to be Learned: The 2012 Fatality Summary". 11 April 2013. Archived from the original on 2016-03-08.
