= Fred Mannering =

American engineer

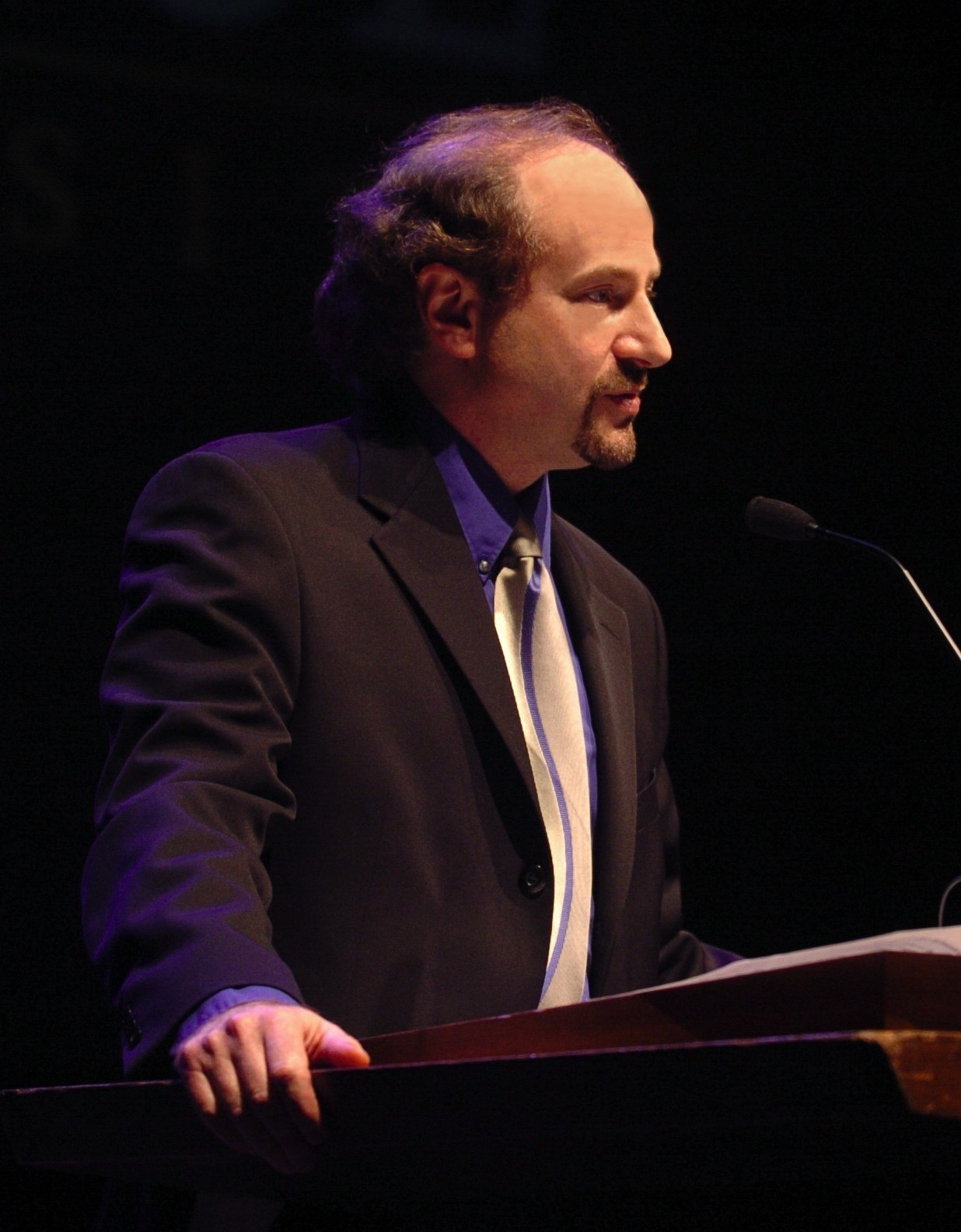
- Born: November 1954 (age 71–72); Pittsburgh, Pennsylvania
- Education: Massachusetts Institute of Technology (Ph.D.)
- Known for: Development and application of statistical and econometric methods
- Scientific career
- Fields: Civil Engineering, Econometrics, Transportation Engineering
- Workplaces: Massachusetts Institute of Technology, Pennsylvania State University, University of Washington, Purdue University, University of South Florida
- Thesis: Dynamic econometric models of household vehicle ownership and utilization
- Doctoral advisor: Clifford Winston
- Other academic advisors: Daniel McFadden, Ann Fetter Friedlaender

Fred Mannering is an American engineering professor who is most known for the development and application of statistical and econometric methods to study highway safety, economics, travel behavior, and a variety of engineering-related problems.

== Early life and education ==
Mannering was born in 1954 (November) in Pittsburgh, Pennsylvania. He attended suburban Pittsburgh's South Fayette High School, received his B.S. degree in engineering from the University of Saskatchewan, M.S. degree from Purdue University, and Ph.D. in engineering from the Massachusetts Institute of Technology where his doctoral committee consisted of Clifford Winston (advisor), Daniel McFadden (Nobel Prize laureate in Economics in 2000) and Ann Fetter Friedlaender.

== Career ==
Mannering is currently a professor of civil and environmental engineering (with a courtesy appointment in economics) and executive director of the Center for Urban Transportation Research at the University of South Florida. He previously held academic positions as head of civil engineering and later as the Charles Pankow Professor at Purdue University. Prior to joining Purdue University, he was a professor and chair of civil and environmental engineering at the University of Washington and an assistant professor at the Pennsylvania State University.

== Honors and Awards ==
Mannering has received numerous awards in his discipline. In 2005 he won the Wilbur S. Smith Award, in 2009 the James Laurie Prize, and in 2010 the Arthur M. Wellington Prize for his papers and work in highway safety (all three awarded by the American Society of Civil Engineers). He received the Murphy Teaching Award, Purdue University's highest undergraduate teaching honor, in 2013. In 2016, he was named by the Eno Foundation as one of the Top 10 Transportation Thought Leaders in Academia and in 2019, his 1996 paper on highway accident frequency was recognized by the American Society of Civil Engineers as one of four Journal of Transportation Engineering Part A: Systems papers that have been instrumental in moving civil engineering forward. In 2020, Mannering was identified as the most highly-cited author (highest total citations and citations per paper) in the 50-year history of the journal Accident Analysis and Prevention and in 2021 he received the Council of University Transportation Centers Lifetime Achievement Award. For eight consecutive years (2019 to 2026 inclusive), Mannering has been recognized as a Highly Cited Researcher on Clarivate's annual list of the world's most influential researchers, a list of researchers recognized for writing multiple highly cited papers that rank in the top 1% by citations for research field and publication year in Web of Science, as well as evidence of community-wide recognition from an international and wide-ranging network of citing authors. In 2026, he was elected a member of the National Academy of Engineering (NAE) "for contributions to transportation engineering data science and innovations in highway safety analytics."

== Research ==
Mannering is known for his work in highway safety, statistics, and econometrics. He has published extensively with over 170 journal articles. Some of his most impactful work includes research on highway accident frequency and injury severity, the effects of unobserved heterogeneity in highway safety analysis, addressing temporal instability in the analysis of highway accident data, and using extreme value theory and artificial intelligence in traffic conflict analytics. He has contributed to the advancement of science and engineering through his teaching and as an author of two widely adopted textbooks: Principles of Highway Engineering and Traffic Analysis and Statistical and Econometric Methods for Transportation Data Analysis. Mannering is the founding editor and chief advisory editor of the Elsevier journal Analytic Methods in Accident Research (having served as editor-in-chief from 2013 to 2024). He is also past editor-in-chief (2004 to 2012) and current distinguished editorial board member of the Elsevier journal Transportation Research Part B - Methodological.

== Music/discography ==
Vulgaris

Studio album by Vulgaris
- Released: December 4, 1994
- Recorded: October 1994
- Studios: Avast! Seattle, WA
- Genre: Heavy/Doom Metal
- Length: 42:00
- Label: Dead Zebra Records (Independent)

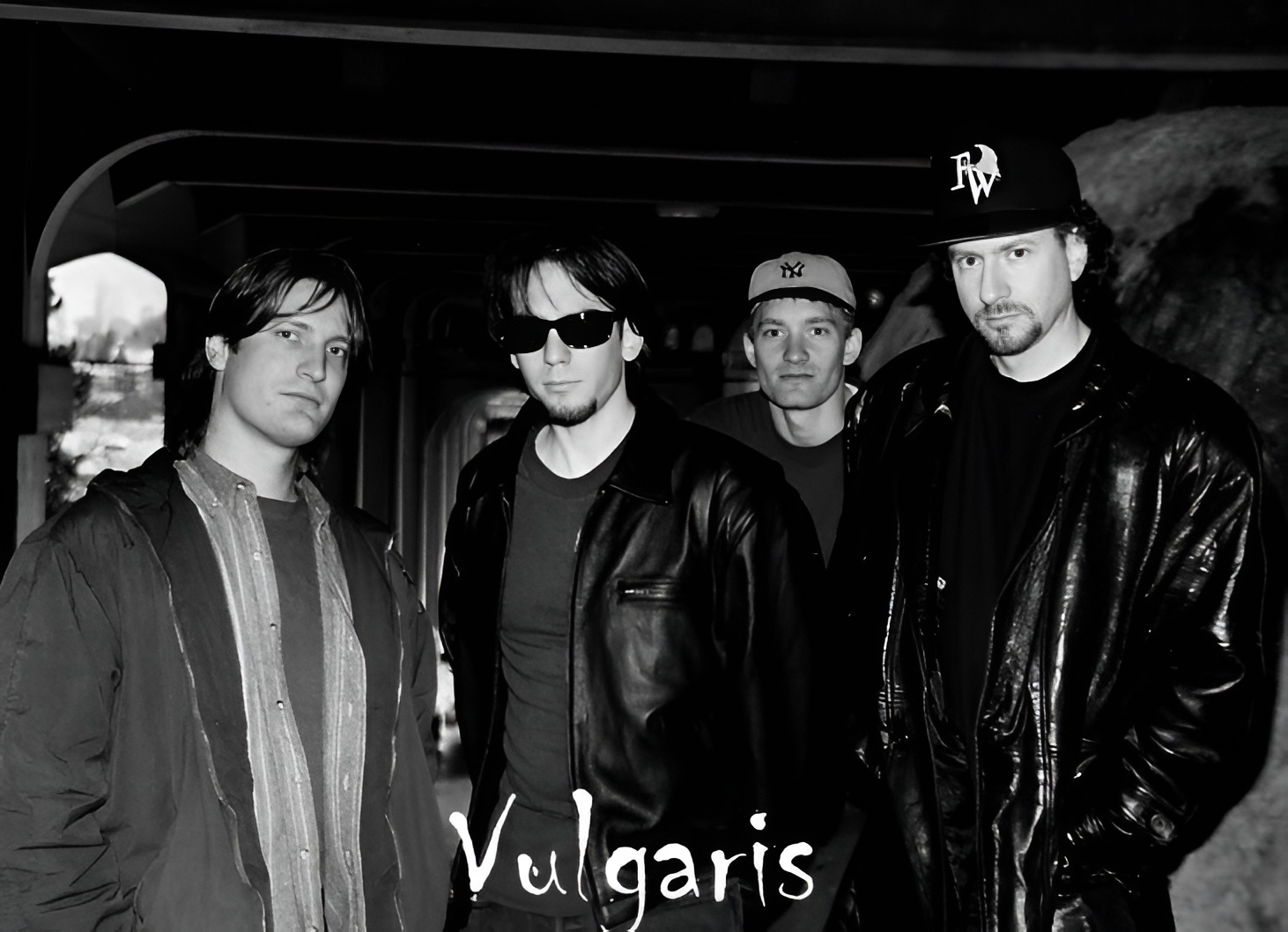
Vulgaris band photo circa 1994 (from left to right: Elliott, Eng, Dumosch, Mannering).

Mannering was a founding member and the lead guitarist in the Seattle Heavy Metal band Vulgaris from 1993 until their split-up in 1996. The band's self-titled debut album Vulgaris was recorded at Seattle's Avast! Studios in October 1994 and released on CD in December 1994.

== Books ==
- Mannering, Fred L.; Washburn, Scott S. (2020). Principles of Highway Engineering and Traffic Analysis (7th ed.). John Wiley & Sons. ISBN 978-1-119-72319-6.
- Washington, Simon; Karlaftis, Matthew; Mannering, Fred; Anastasopoulos, Panagiotis (2020). Statistical and Econometric Methods for Transportation Data Analysis (3rd ed.). Chapman & Hall/CRC. doi:10.1201/9780429244018. ISBN 978-0-429-24401-8.

== Selected and most cited publications ==
- Ali, Y., Haque, M., Mannering, F., (September 2023). Assessing traffic conflict/crash relationships with extreme value theory: Recent developments and future directions for connected and autonomous vehicle and highway safety research. Analytic Methods in Accident Research 39, 100276. https://doi.org/10.1016/j.amar.2023.100276
- Zheng, Lai; Sayed, Tarek; Mannering, Fred (March 2021). "Modeling traffic conflicts for use in road safety analysis: A review of analytic methods and future directions". Analytic Methods in Accident Research. 29: 100142. https://doi.org/10.1016/j.amar.2020.100142.
- Mannering, Fred; Bhat, Chandra R.; Shankar, Venky; Abdel-Aty, Mohamed (March 2020). "Big data, traditional data and the tradeoffs between prediction and causality in highway-safety analysis". Analytic Methods in Accident Research. 25 100113. doi:10.1016/j.amar.2020.100113.
- Mannering, Fred (March 2018). "Temporal instability and the analysis of highway accident data". Analytic Methods in Accident Research. 17: 1–13. doi:10.1016/j.amar.2017.10.002.
- Mannering, Fred L.; Shankar, Venky; Bhat, Chandra R. (September 2016). "Unobserved heterogeneity and the statistical analysis of highway accident data". Analytic Methods in Accident Research. 11: 1–16. doi:10.1016/j.amar.2016.04.001.
- Mannering, Fred L.; Bhat, Chandra R. (January 2014). "Analytic methods in accident research: Methodological frontier and future directions". Analytic Methods in Accident Research. 1: 1–22. doi:10.1016/j.amar.2013.09.001.
- Xiong, Yingge; Mannering, Fred (March 2013). "The heterogeneous effects of guardian supervision on adolescent driver-injury severities: A finite-mixture random-parameters approach". Transportation Research Part B: Methodological. 49: 39-54. doi:10.1016/j.trb.2013.01.002
- Savolainen, Peter T.; Mannering, Fred L.; Lord, Dominique; Quddus, Mohammed A. (September 2011). "The statistical analysis of highway crash-injury severities: A review and assessment of methodological alternatives". Accident Analysis & Prevention. 43 (5): 1666–1676. doi:10.1016/j.aap.2011.03.025. PMID 21658493.
- Lord, Dominique; Mannering, Fred (June 2010). "The statistical analysis of crash-frequency data: A review and assessment of methodological alternatives". Transportation Research Part A: Policy and Practice. 44 (5): 291–305. Bibcode:2010TRPA...44..291L. doi:10.1016/j.tra.2010.02.001.
- Anastasopoulos, Panagiotis Ch.; Mannering, Fred L. (January 2009). "A note on modeling vehicle accident frequencies with random-parameters count models". Accident Analysis & Prevention. 41 (1): 153–159. doi:10.1016/j.aap.2008.10.005. PMID 19114150.
- Milton, John C.; Shankar, Venky N.; Mannering, Fred L. (January 2008). "Highway accident severities and the mixed logit model: An exploratory empirical analysis". Accident Analysis & Prevention. 40 (1): 260–266. doi:10.1016/j.aap.2007.06.006. PMID 18215557.
- Nam, Doohee; Mannering, Fred (February 2000). "Hazard-based analysis of highway incident duration". Transportation Research Part A: Policy and Practice. 34 (2): 85-102. doi:10.1016/S0965-8564(98)00065-2
- Poch, Mark; Mannering, Fred (March 1996). "Negative Binomial Analysis of Intersection-Accident Frequencies". Journal of Transportation Engineering. 122 (2): 105–113. doi:10.1061/(ASCE)0733-947X(1996)122:2(105).
- Mannering, Fred; Winston, Clifford (1985). "A Dynamic Empirical Analysis of Household Vehicle Ownership and Utilization". The RAND Journal of Economics. 16 (2): 215–236. doi:10.2307/2555411. JSTOR 2555411.
- Mannering, Fred (May 1983). "An econometric analysis of vehicle use in multivehicle households". Transportation Research Part A: General. 17 (3): 183-189. doi.org/10.1016/0191-2607(83)90040-7.
