= Shared space =

Roads unsegregated by travel mode

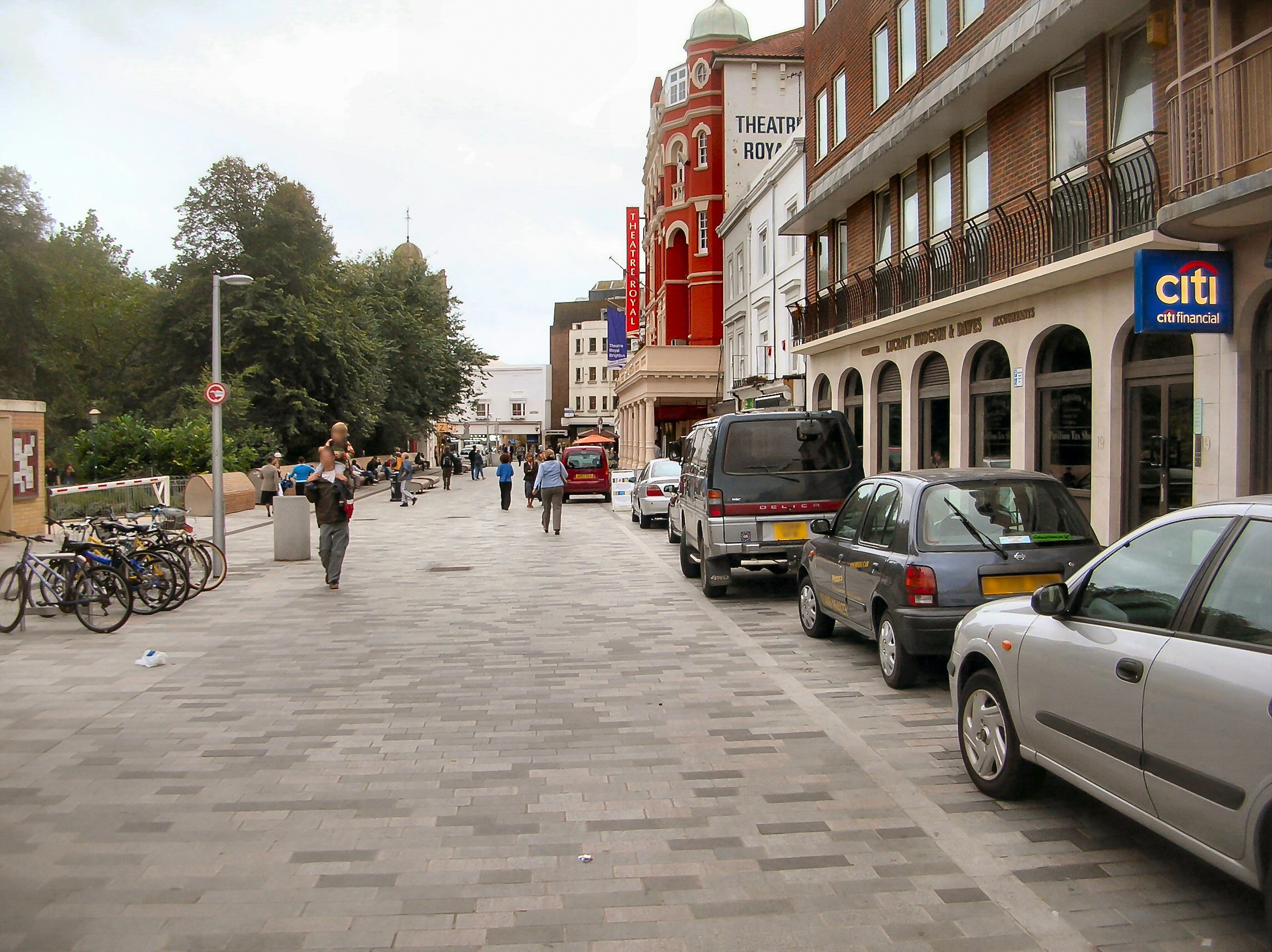
A shared space scheme in New Road, Brighton, United Kingdom

Shared space is an urban design approach that minimises the segregation between modes of road user. This is done by removing features such as curbs, road surface markings, traffic signs, and traffic lights. Hans Monderman and others have suggested that, by creating a greater sense of uncertainty and making it unclear who has priority, drivers will reduce their speed, in turn reducing the dominance of vehicles, reducing road casualty rates, and improving safety for other road users.

Shared space design can take many different forms depending on the level of demarcation and segregation between different transportation modes. Variations of shared space are often used in urban settings, especially those that have been made nearly car-free (Dutch: autoluw), and as part of living streets within residential areas. As a separate concept, "shared space" normally applies to semi-open spaces on busier roads, and here it is controversial.

Shared space is often opposed by organisations representing the interests of blind, partially sighted, and deaf people, who usually express a preference for the clear separation of pedestrian and vehicular traffic.

== History ==
The origin of the term is generally linked with the work of Dutch traffic engineer Hans Monderman, who pioneered the method in the Dutch province of Friesland. Prior to the adoption of the term, street design projects carried out in Chambéry, France, by Michel Deronzier from the 1980s used the term "pedestrian priority". The term was used by Tim Pharoah to describe informal street layouts with no traffic demarcation (for example "Traffic Calming Guidelines", Devon County Council, 1991).

The term has been widely applied, especially by Ben Hamilton-Baillie, since the preparation of a European co-operation project in 2003. The European Shared Space project (part of the Interreg IIIB-North Sea programme) developed new policies and methods for the design of public spaces with streets between 2004 and 2008 under the leadership of Hans Monderman until his death in 2008.

The Chartered Institution of Highways and Transportation has identified three broad types of street design approach that have been called shared space but which have a number of important differences. They suggest that the term "shared space" should be replaced by three new labels: pedestrian prioritised streets, informal streets and enhanced streets.

== Rationale ==
The goal of shared space is to improve the road safety and vibrancy of roads and junctions, particularly ones with high levels of pedestrian traffic, by encouraging negotiation of priority in shared areas between different road users. Shared space is a "design approach rather than a design type characterised by standard features".

Hans Monderman suggested that an individual's behaviour in traffic is more positively affected by the built environment of the public space than by conventional traffic control devices and regulations. A reason for the apparent paradox that reduced regulation leads to safer roads may be found by studying the risk compensation effect.

- "We're losing our capacity for socially responsible behaviour...The greater the number of prescriptions, the more people's sense of personal responsibility dwindles." (Der Spiegel quotes Monderman)
- "When you don't exactly know who has right of way, you tend to seek eye contact with other road users. You automatically reduce your speed, you have contact with other people and you take greater care."

Such schemes are claimed to have had positive effect on road safety, traffic volume, economic vitality, and community cohesion where a user's behaviour becomes influenced and controlled by natural human interactions rather than by artificial regulation. Monderman has stated that objections are more a matter of communication than design, stressing the importance of consulting all relevant groups during the design stage.

== Criticism ==
Reviewing the research that underpinned national policy in the UK, in 2011, Moody and Melia found that some of the claims made for shared space schemes were not justified by the evidence—particularly the claims that pedestrians are able to follow desire lines, and that shared space reduces traffic speeds. Their primary research in Ashford, Kent, suggested that in streets with high volumes of traffic, pedestrians are more likely to give way to vehicles than vice versa. Most people, but particularly women and older people, found the shared space intimidating and preferred the previous layout with conventional crossings. A study by Hammond and Musselwhite using a case study of Widemarsh Street in Hereford found that if traffic volume was relatively low and speeds of vehicles slow anyway, then vulnerable road users found it easier to share the area with vehicles, including those blind or partially sighted and older people with mobility impairments.

There are wide-ranging reservations about the practicality of the shared space philosophy where it involves the removal of features such as kerbs. In a 2006 report from the Associated Press, it was commented that traditionalists in town planning departments say the schemes rob the motorists of vital information, and reported that a spokesman for Royal National Institute of Blind People criticised the removal of familiar features such as railings, kerbs, and barriers.

The British Transport Research Laboratory found that below flows of 90 vehicles per hour adult pedestrians were prepared to mingle with traffic. When flows reached 110 vehicles per hour, they used the width between frontages as if it were a traditional road. A similar value is used to define suitability for a woonerf.

The UK's Department for Transport issued national guidance on shared space in 2011. However, in July 2018 it reversed its position and instructed local authorities to halt all new shared space projects, with Transport Minister Nusrat Ghani stating they "just don't work" for blind and partially-sighted people.

In 2014, a review of the evolution of the shared space concepts was offered in Transport Reviews: A Transnational Transdisciplinary Journal. Lord Holmes' 2015 report Accidents by Design found that sixty-three per cent of respondents reported a negative experience of shared space, and thirty-five per cent said they actively avoided it. Lord Holmes attacked the concept as a recipe for "confusion, chaos and catastrophe".

The Dutch Fietsberaad (Centre of Expertise on Bicycle Policy) has demonstrated ambivalence over shared space schemes, describing some benefits but also some drawbacks for the less assertive cyclist. Fietsberaad has noted that shared space has decreased car speeds but that "some cyclists do not dare take priority. Instead, they dismount and wait for priority to be clearly given, then walk or ride across the intersection. A problem may be that they are met halfway by cars from the other direction and must rely on the drivers to give way of their own volition. Owing to low speeds and the cyclists' defensive behaviour this crossing strategy need not be unsafe in itself, but it most certainly is not convenient."

== Disabled people ==
Shared space is opposed by many organisations representing blind, partially sighted and deaf people. Some of their members avoid shared space areas entirely. Shared surfaces, which are generally used in shared space schemes, can cause concern for the blind and partially sighted who cannot visually negotiate their way with other road users, as the lack of separation implicit in these features has also removed their safe space. The UK's Guide Dogs for the Blind Associations "Say No to Shared Streets" campaign has the support of more than thirty other disability organisations. There have been similar concerns raised by other groups representing disabled people, including Leonard Cheshire Disability, the Royal National Institute for Deaf People, and Mencap, who have noted problems when negotiating a route with motor vehicle users, leading them to challenge its fundamental premise.

In 2015, the Holmes report noted serious issues for wheelchair users: "Respondents who used wheelchairs stated that it was virtually impossible to locate a safe crossing point on roads with shared space." In July 2018, the UK DfT reversed its position on shared spaces due to the risk to disabled people, with Transport Minister Nusrat Ghani stating "they just don't work".

In New Zealand, concerns about such limitations of the shared space concept have led, in cooperation with disability organisations, to the introduction of vehicle- and obstruction-free corridors ("accessible zones") along the building lines (i.e. in the areas where footpaths would normally be located), to provide a safe route in the shared spaces being introduced.

== Examples ==
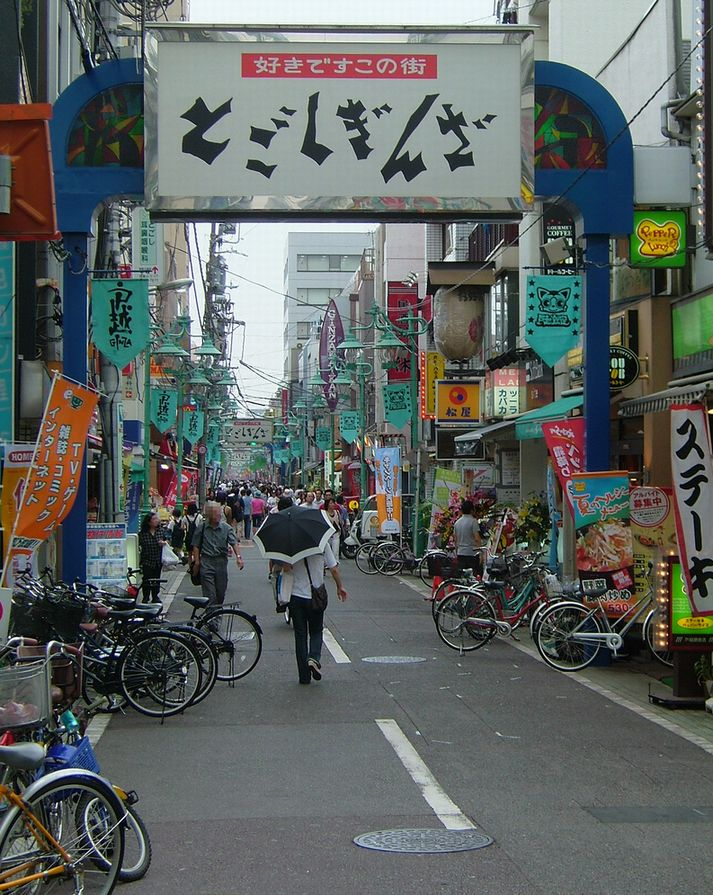
Many streets in Tokyo are shared, though not as a result of outright policy.

Numerous towns and cities around the world have implemented schemes with elements based on the shared space principles.

=== Australia ===
Bendigo, Victoria, plans (as of October 2007) to implement shared space in its city centre. The Streets as Shared Spaces program supported 65 councils across New South Wales in developing shared spaces, since its launch in May 2020.

=== Austria ===
In October 2011, Graz opened a shared space zone around a five-point intersection known as Sonnenfelsplatz next to the University of Graz with the intention of easing congestion from 4 separate city bus lines and auto, bike and pedestrian traffic as well as reducing the number of accidents. This was the first shared space concept for Austria.

=== Denmark ===
Ejby introduced a shared space project in Denmark. It was part of the European Interreg IIIB project with Province of Fyslän as lead partner. The project was led by urban planner Morten Mejsen Westergaard and Bjarne Winterberg. It was supervised by Hans Monderman.

=== Germany ===
Bohmte introduced a shared space road system in September 2007. One of project's goals was to improve road safety in the town.

=== Netherlands ===
Makkinga has no road markings and no signs giving an order or direction signs visible in the streets. There is a traffic sign at the entrance to the town that reads Verkeersbordvrij, meaning "free of traffic signs". Parking meters and stopping restrictions are also absent. Drachten is another pioneer town for such schemes. Accident figures at one junction where traffic lights were removed have dropped from thirty-six in the four years prior to the introduction of the scheme to two in the two years following it. Only three of the original fifteen sets of traffic lights remain. Tailbacks (traffic jams) are now almost unheard of at the town's main junction, which handles about 22,000 cars a day.

An evaluation of the Laweiplein scheme in Drachten, which replaced a set of traffic lights with an open square with a roundabout and pedestrian crossings, concluded that traffic now flows at a constant rate, at equal speeds for motor and bicycle traffic, and more freely with reduced congestion, shorter delays and improved capacity including for pedestrians. The evaluation states that there has been a reduction in recorded accidents, but cyclist and motorist perceptions of traffic safety have slightly declined. This is in accordance with theories of how shared spaces work by creating uncertainty. Meanwhile, pedestrian perceptions of traffic safety seem to have remained the same.

=== New Zealand ===
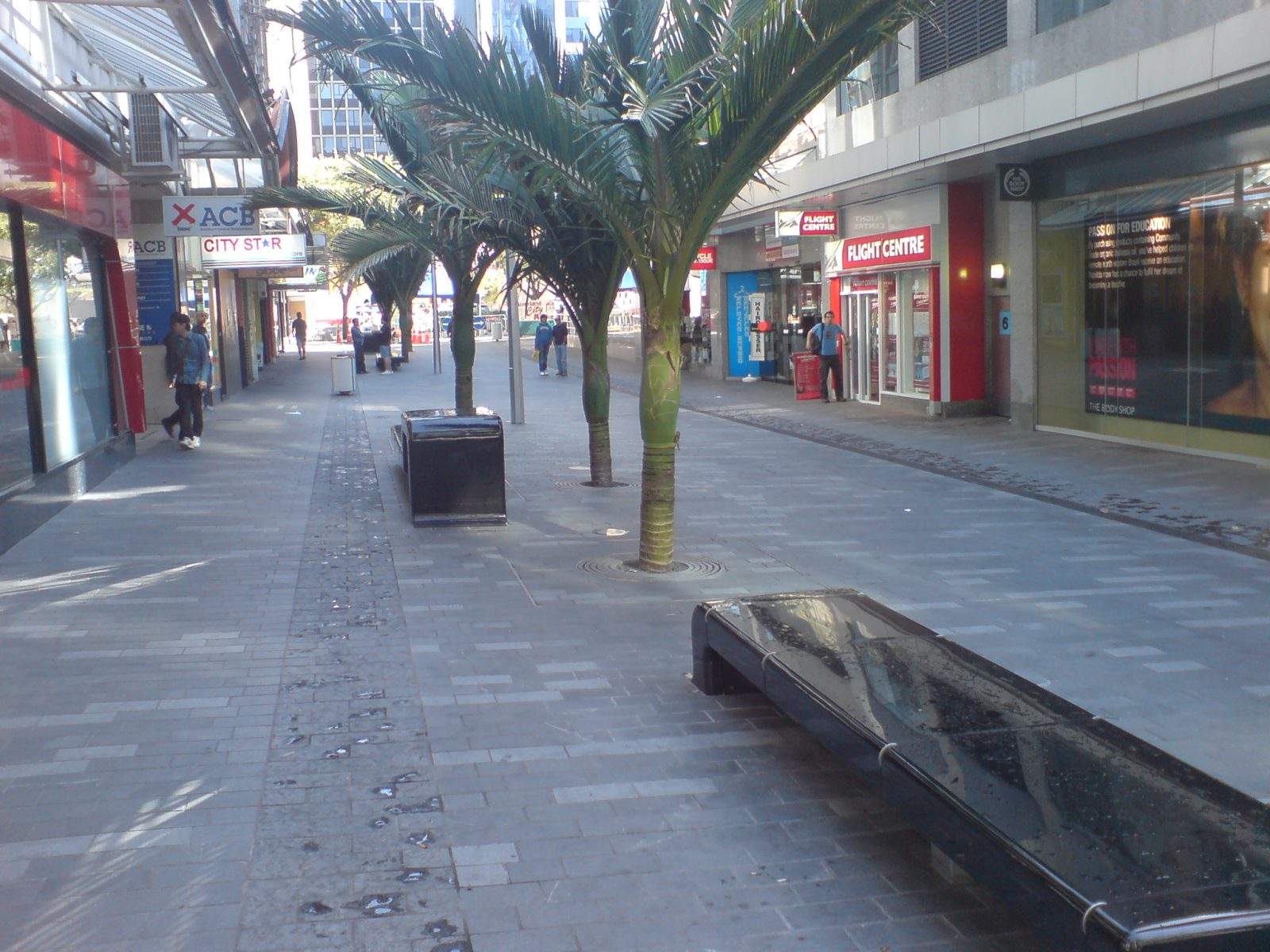
Auckland, New Zealand, responded to disability groups' concerns by ensuring that a strip of "accessible zone" would be retained in the design. This strip is made off limits to vehicles by strategically placed street furniture, while the building edge and paving strips provide guidance to vision-impaired people.

Several of Auckland's streets have been turned into shared spaces. These include Elliot and Darby Streets, Lorne street, the Fort street areas, all near Queen Street, Auckland and Federal Street by the Skytower. However, Auckland's first shared space is Wairepo Swamp Walk, completed mid-2010. Wairepo Swamp Walk is one of a number of transport infrastructure projects improving transport services around Eden Park as part of the 2011 Rugby World Cup. A research study has been undertaken by Auckland Transport in conjunction with the University of Auckland to evaluate city centre shared spaces in the Auckland CBD.

=== Sweden ===
Since the zebra crossings and traffic signs were replaced with a spacious fountain, benches, and other street furniture, the Skvallertorget square in Norrköping has experienced no accidents, mean traffic speeds have dropped from 21 to 16 km/h (13 to 10 mph) and liveability has increased.

=== Switzerland ===
The concept of a shared space where no right of way is defined for all participants is presently not legally possible. The Strassenverkehrsgesetz (SVG) requires that at least one of the participants has a right of way. As a result, the Swiss concept of Begegnungszone has become popular. However here pedestrians have right of way.

=== United Kingdom ===
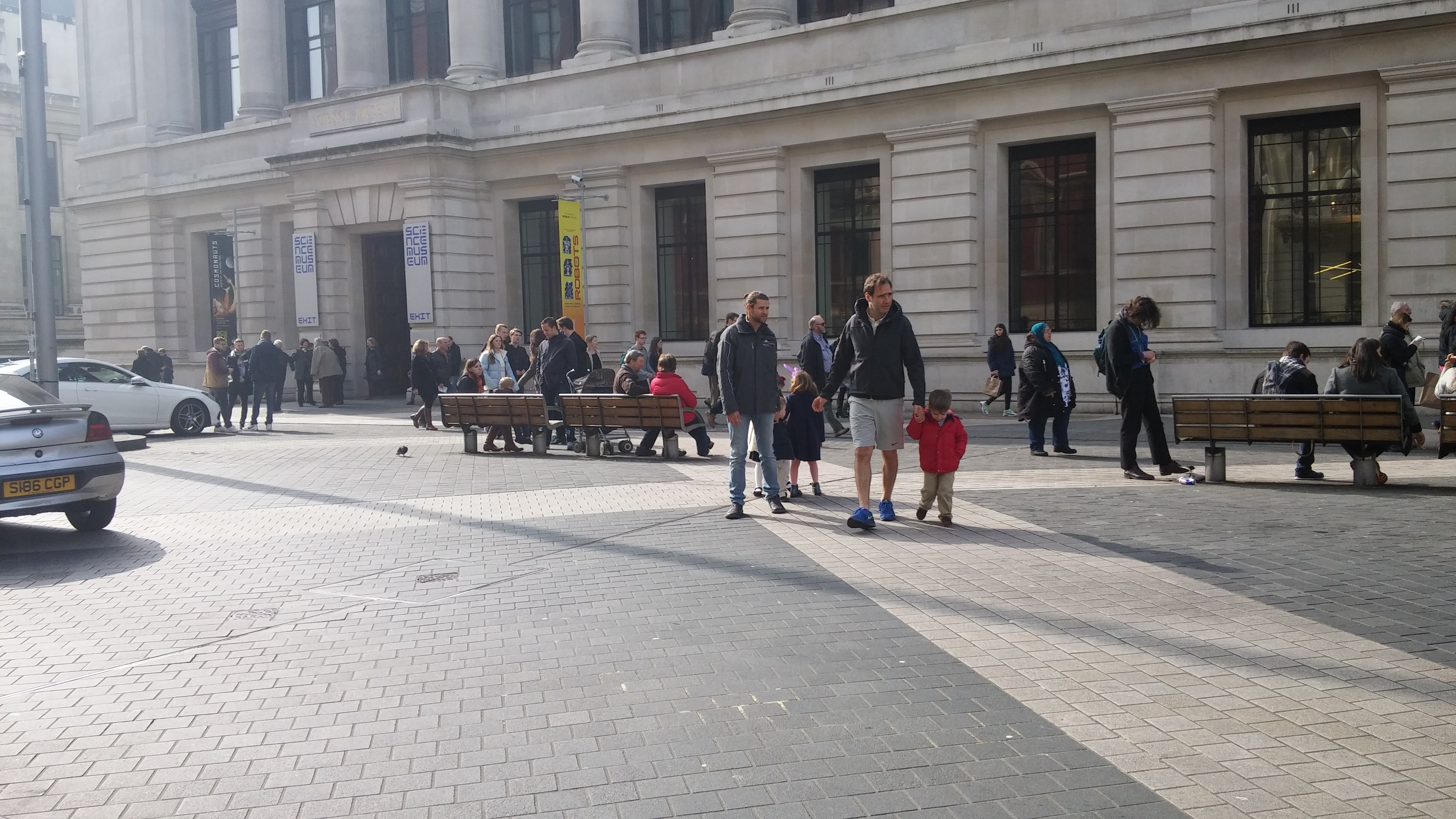
Exhibition Road, London, "shared space"

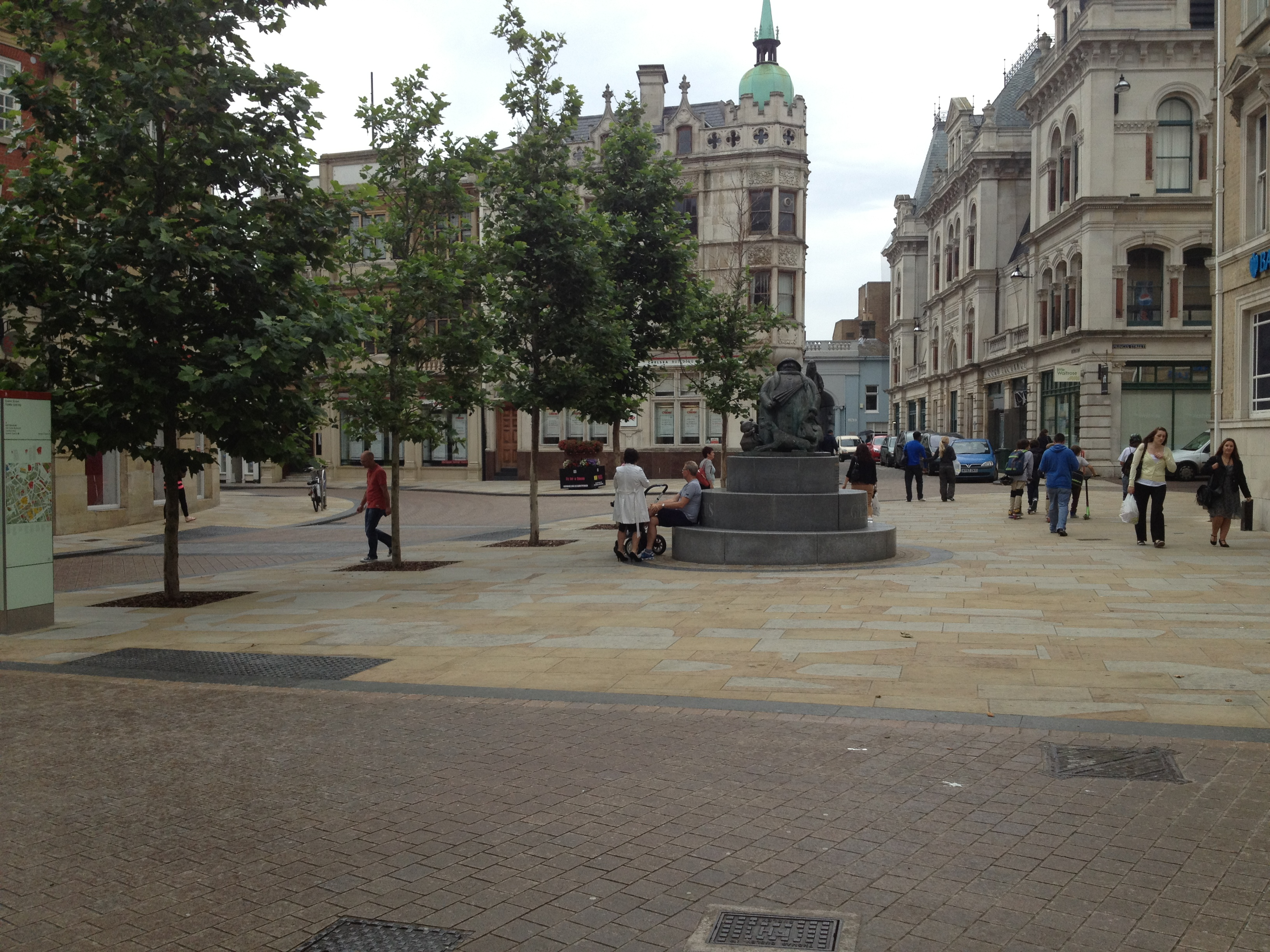
A shared space scheme in Giles Circus, Ipswich (England)

In London, Exhibition Road was developed into a shared space in 2012 after a design competition in 2003, a court case, and numerous community consultations.

In Seven Dials, London, the road surface has been re-laid to remove the distinction between the roadway and the footway and kerbs have been lowered to encourage people to wander across the street. A scheme implemented in London's Kensington High Street, dubbed naked streets in the press – reflecting the removal of markings, signage and pedestrian barriers – has yielded significant and sustained reductions in injuries to pedestrians. It is reported that, based on two years of 'before and after' monitoring, casualties fell from 71 in the period before the street was remodelled to 40 afterwards – a drop of 43%.

Gwynedd Council rebuilt the foreground to Caernarfon Castle. The scheme uses local slate and granite surfacing and high-quality street furniture, and a new fountain, intended to create a change in the behaviour of drivers.

Brighton City Council transformed the whole of New Road, adjacent to the Royal Pavilion, into a fully shared space designed by Landscape Projects and Gehl Architects, with no delineation of the carriageway except for subtle changes in materials. The route for vehicles along New Road is only suggested through the location of street furniture, such as public seating and street lights. The re-opening of the street has led to a 93% reduction in motor vehicle trips (12,000 fewer per day) and lower speeds (to around 10 MPH), alongside an increase in cyclist and pedestrian usage (93% and 162%, respectively).

In spring 2008, shared space was introduced in Ashford, Kent. The scheme replaced a section of Ashford's former four-lane ring road with two-way streets on which drivers, cyclists, and pedestrians have equal priority. Unnecessary street furniture, road markings and traffic lights have been removed and the speed limit cut to 20 mph. The scheme has been claimed to have improved safety records. Between November 2008 and January 2011, there have been four road casualties there, resulting from the six reported accidents. Claims about the success of the Ashford scheme were called into question during 2011 by a study conducted by the University of the West of England.

Following the initial reports claiming a success for the Ashford scheme, other UK local councils planned to use a similar approach; these include Southend-on-Sea, Staines, Newcastle-under-Lyme, Hereford, and Edinburgh.

There have also been trials in Ipswich, with shared space being a key feature of the design of the new Ravenswood community being built on the site of the former Ipswich Airport.

At Princess Royal Square (formerly Pier Square) in Weston-super-Mare, the conventional road system has been replaced by a seafront open area. This has been complemented by the restoration of the Coalbrookdale fountain in its centre.

In Poynton, Cheshire, it was found that as well as providing significant safety improvements, and regenerating the retail and social centre, the road capacity was not reduced after the redevelopment of a busy junction in the town incorporated shared space elements. In the scheme, the redevelopment of a multi-lane signalised crossroads, with a traffic flow of 26,000 vehicles per day, which was completed in March 2012, traffic lanes, signals, road markings, road signs and street clutter were all removed. In the first three years after the redevelopment there was one minor personal injury accident, compared to 4-7 serious incidents in each of the three years leading up to the project. Although no speed limit changes were made, average traffic speeds fell to around 20 mph and there were reductions in vehicle journey times as well as reductions in pedestrian delays at the junction.

A pilot road layout project, which includes shared-space elements, is to be trialled in the Stobhill area of Morpeth, Northumberland. Opposition groups argue that the plans are unsafe for children and disabled people.

=== United States ===
In the United States, the shared space concept has become more popular in recent years.

In West Palm Beach, Florida, removal of traffic signals and road markings brought pedestrians into much closer contact with cars. The result has been slower traffic, fewer accidents, and shorter trip times.

In Savannah, Georgia, the Oglethorpe Plan has been adapted to accommodate pedestrian and vehicular traffic throughout a network of wards, each with a central square. The size and configuration of the squares restrains vehicular traffic to speeds under 20 miles per hour, a threshold speed beyond which shared space tends to break down.

In Salt Lake City, Utah the City Creek Center property was designed with a kerbless street and bollards. Following the success of this, the publicly owned side of Regent Street was redone to be kerbless as well.

Shared streets have also been installed in the New York City neighbourhoods of Jamaica, and Flatiron. In the Financial District, there are plans to remove curbs in areas that have been closed off to vehicular traffic since the 9/11 attacks.

In 2018, the Philadelphia region's Metropolitan Planning Organization DVRPC published a guide for engineers and policymakers Curbless Streets: Evaluating Curbless and Shared Space Concepts for Use on City of Philadelphia Streets. The US Federal Highway Administration has also issued a publication, Accessible Shared Streets: Notable Practices and Considerations for Accommodating Pedestrians with Vision Disabilities.

== See also ==
General themes

- Bicycle-friendly – Urban planning prioritising cycling
- Cyclability – Degree of ease of cycling
- Naked street – Road designed without traditional signs
- School street – Pedestrian street in front of a school
- Traffic calming – Road safety design measure
- Traffic conflict – Averted road collision
- Tullock's spike – Spike projecing from the steering wheel

Proponents

- John Adams – British academic (1938–2024)
- Eric Britton – American economist
- Martin Cassini – British TV programme maker and campaigner
- David Engwicht – Australian urban planner
- Jan Gehl – Danish architect
- Project for Public Spaces – Advocacy group for shared public places
