= Maximum score =

Maximum score may refer to:

- Maximum score estimator, a statistical method developed by Charles Manski in 1975.
- Maximum score (golf), a format of play in the sport of golf.
- Maximum break, the highest possible break in a single frame of snooker.
