= Hybrid choice model =

Econometric model that blends observed data with latent psychological factors

Hybrid choice models (HCMs) are extensions of classical discrete-choice models that combine what analysts can observe—prices, incomes and travel times—with what they cannot measure directly, such as attitudes, perceptions and habits. Unlike standard models, which recover preferences only from observed choices, an HCM links those choices to one or more latent variables—statistical constructs that represent psychological traits. Integrating such constructs into a random-utility framework improves both behavioural realism and predictive accuracy.

== Conceptual framework ==
A typical HCM contains three interconnected blocks. Structural equations describe how latent variables depend on socio-economic characteristics and on one another; measurement equations relate each latent variable to survey indicators, creating a statistical bridge between unobserved attitudes and their noisy proxies; and a conventional choice model links both latent and manifest variables to the probability that an individual selects a particular alternative. Later work clarified identification conditions and introduced simulation-efficient estimators that scale to large data sets.

== Applications ==
Transportation. Hybrid models clarify how safety norms or environmental concern shape preferences for cars, public transport and new mobility technologies. A study of Austria's car market, for example, showed that a latent "green" attitude substantially increases the probability of choosing an electric vehicle, even after controlling for price and driving range.

Marketing. In consumer research HCMs connect stated perceptions of quality or loyalty to revealed purchase data. An application to the chocolate-bar market found that latent loyalty toward manufacturer or private-label brands strongly mediates price sensitivity.

Health economics. By incorporating latent risk and burden perceptions, HCMs improve forecasts of treatment uptake. For lower-back–pain therapies, adding a latent "fear-of-movement" construct increased model fit and changed welfare estimates for alternative interventions.

Environmental policy. Analysts use HCMs to study pro-environmental behaviour. A grey-water reuse study found that latent concern about water scarcity was a stronger driver of adoption than installation cost alone.

== Strengths and challenges ==
Because HCMs embed attitudes directly in the utility function they can improve behavioural realism, run "what-if" simulations that target beliefs rather than prices, and reduce omitted-variable bias when latent factors correlate with observed attributes. Critics caution that policy simulations must respect the psychological theory behind the latent variables; otherwise results may be hard to interpret. Data requirements are demanding—surveys must collect attitudinal indicators for every respondent—and estimating many random parameters can be computationally expensive, although new algorithms mitigate that burden.
