= Alexander Fetter =

American physicist

Alexander Lees ("Sandy") Fetter (born 16 May 1937) is an American physicist and Professor Emeritus of Physics and Applied Physics at Stanford University in California. His research interests include theoretical condensed matter and superconductivity.

Fetter was born in Philadelphia. He graduated with a B.A. from Williams College in 1958, where he was valedictorian. He was also a Rhodes Scholar at Balliol College of Oxford University. He went on to receive a Ph.D. in physics at Harvard University in 1963.

In 1968, Fetter joined the faculty at Stanford University, and has been there since. He served as chair of the department from 1985 to 1990.

Fetter is a fellow of the American Physical Society and American Association for the Advancement of Science. He served as the director of the Hansen Experimental Physics Laboratory and the Geballe Laboratory for Advanced Materials.

Alexander Fetter retired from full-time as a professor in November 2007, but continues to work half time there.

== Personal life ==
Alexander Fetter was married to Jean Fetter (who is now married to Steven Chu, Alexander's former colleague and a former Secretary of Energy under President Obama) and had 2 children with her (Anne L. Fetter, and Andrew J. Fetter), and is currently married to Lynn Bunim. His sister Ann ("Nan") Fetter Friedlaender was the first woman Dean at MIT (Economics Department). Fetter has 6 grandchildren the first of whom was born in 1995 and the most recent in 2007.

== Selected publications ==
- Quantum Theory of Many-Particle Systems, Dover Publications, 2003, ISBN 978-0-486-42827-7
- Theoretical Mechanics of Particles and Continua, Dover Publications, 2003, ISBN 978-0-486-43261-8
- Nonlinear Mechanics: A Supplement to Theoretical Mechanics of Particles and Continua, Dover Publications, 2006, ISBN 978-0-486-45031-5
- Nonuniform states of an imperfect bose gas, Annals of Physics, 1972
