= Mixed logit =

Statistical model

Mixed logit is a fully general statistical model for examining discrete choices. It overcomes three important limitations of the standard logit model by allowing for random taste variation across choosers, unrestricted substitution patterns across choices, and correlation in unobserved factors over time. Mixed logit can choose any distribution $f$ for the random coefficients, unlike probit which is limited to the normal distribution. It is called "mixed logit" because the choice probability is a mixture of logits, with $f$ as the mixing distribution. It has been shown that a mixed logit model can approximate to any degree of accuracy any true random utility model of discrete choice, given appropriate specification of variables and the coefficient distribution.

== Random taste variation ==
The standard logit model's "taste" coefficients, or $\beta$'s, are fixed, which means the $\beta$'s are the same for everyone. Mixed logit has different $\beta$'s for each person (i.e., each decision maker.)

In the standard logit model, the utility of person $n$ for alternative $i$ is:

$$U_{ni} = \beta x_{ni} + \varepsilon_{ni}$$

with

$\varepsilon_{ni}$ ~ iid extreme value

For the mixed logit model, this specification is generalized by allowing $\beta_n$ to be random. The utility of person $n$ for alternative $i$ in the mixed logit model is:

$$U_{ni} = \beta_n x_{ni} + \varepsilon_{ni}$$

with

$\varepsilon_{ni}$ ~ iid extreme value

$$\quad \beta_n \sim f(\beta | \theta)$$

where θ are the parameters of the distribution of $\beta_n$'s over the population, such as the mean and variance of $\beta_n$.

Conditional on $\beta_n$, the probability that person $n$ chooses alternative $i$ is the standard logit formula:

$$L_{ni} (\beta_{n}) = \frac{e^{\beta_{n}X_{ni}}} {\sum_{j} e^{\beta_{n}X_{nj}}}$$

However, since $\beta_n$ is random and not known, the (unconditional) choice probability is the integral of this logit formula over the density of $\beta_n$.

$$P_{ni} = \int L_{ni} (\beta) f(\beta | \theta) d\beta$$

This model is also called the random coefficient logit model since $\beta_n$ is a random variable. It allows the slopes of utility (i.e., the marginal utility) to be random, which is an extension of the random effects model where only the intercept was stochastic.

Any probability density function can be specified for the distribution of the coefficients in the population, i.e., for $f(\beta | \theta)$. The most widely used distribution is normal, mainly for its simplicity. For coefficients that take the same sign for all people, such as a price coefficient that is necessarily negative or the coefficient of a desirable attribute, distributions with support on only one side of zero, like the lognormal, are used. When coefficients cannot logically be unboundedly large or small, then bounded distributions are often used, such as the $S_b$ or triangular distributions.

== Unrestricted substitution patterns ==
The mixed logit model can represent general substitution pattern because it does not exhibit logit's restrictive independence of irrelevant alternatives (IIA) property. The percentage change in person $n$'s unconditional probability of choosing alternative $i$ given a percentage change in the mth attribute of alternative $j$ (the elasticity of $P_{ni}$ with respect to $x_{nj}^m$) is

$$\text{Elasticity}_{P_{ni},x_{nj}^m} = -\frac{x_{nj}^m} {P_{ni}} \int \beta^m L_{ni}(\beta) L_{nj}(\beta) f(\beta) d \beta = - x_{nj}^m \int \beta^m L_{nj} (\beta) \frac{L_{ni} (\beta)} {P_{ni}} f(\beta) d \beta$$

where $\beta^m$ is the mth element of $\beta$. It can be seen from this formula that a ten-percent reduction for $P_{ni}$ need not imply (as with logit) a ten-percent reduction in each other alternative $P_{nj}$. The reason is that the relative percentages depend on the correlation between the conditional likelihood that person $n$ will choose alternative $i, L_{ni},$ and the conditional likelihood that person $n$ will choose alternative $j, L_{nj},$ over various draws of $\beta$.

== Correlation in unobserved factors over time ==
Standard logit does not take into account any unobserved factors that persist over time for a given decision maker. This can be a problem if you are using panel data, which represent repeated choices over time. By applying a standard logit model to panel data you are making the assumption that the unobserved factors that affect a person's choice are new every time the person makes the choice. That is a very unlikely assumption. To take into account both random taste variation and correlation in unobserved factors over time, the utility for respondent n for alternative i at time t is specified as follows:

$$U_{nit} = \beta_{n} X_{nit} + \varepsilon_{nit}$$

where the subscript t is the time dimension. We still make the logit assumption which is that $\varepsilon$ is i.i.d extreme value. That means that $\varepsilon$ is independent over time, people, and alternatives. $\varepsilon$ is essentially just white noise. However, correlation over time and over alternatives arises from the common effect of the $\beta$'s, which enter utility in each time period and each alternative.

To examine the correlation explicitly, assume that the β's are normally distributed with mean $\bar{\beta}$ and variance $\sigma^2$. Then the utility equation becomes:

$$U_{nit} = (\bar{\beta} + \sigma \eta_{n}) X_{nit} + \varepsilon_{nit}$$

and η is a draw from the standard normal density. Rearranging, the equation becomes:

$$U_{nit} = \bar{\beta} X_{nit} + (\sigma \eta_{n} X_{nit} + \varepsilon_{nit})$$

$$U_{nit} = \bar{\beta} X_{nit} + e_{nit}$$

where the unobserved factors are collected in $e_{nit} = \sigma \eta_{n} X_{nit} + \varepsilon_{nit}$. Of the unobserved factors, $\varepsilon_{nit}$ is independent over time, and $\sigma \eta_{n} X_{nit}$ is not independent over time or alternatives.

Then the covariance between alternatives $i$ and $j$ is,

$$\text{Cov}(e_{nit}, e_{njt}) = \sigma^2 (X_{nit} X_{njt})$$

and the covariance between time $t$ and $q$ is

$$\text{Cov}(e_{nit}, e_{niq}) = \sigma^2 (X_{nit} X_{niq})$$

By specifying the X's appropriately, one can obtain any pattern of covariance over time and alternatives.

Conditional on $\beta_n$, the probability of the sequence of choices by a person is simply the product of the logit probability of each individual choice by that person:

$$L_{n} (\beta_{n}) = \prod_{t} \frac{e^{\beta_{n}X_{nit}}} {\sum_{j} e^{\beta_{n}X_{njt}}}$$

since $\varepsilon_{nit}$ is independent over time. Then the (unconditional) probability of the sequence of choices is simply the integral of this product of logits over the density of $\beta$.

$$P_{ni} = \int L_{n} (\beta) f(\beta | \theta) d\beta$$

== Simulation ==
Unfortunately there is no closed form for the integral that enters the choice probability, and so the researcher must simulate P_{n}. Fortunately for the researcher, simulating P_{n} can be very simple. There are four basic steps to follow

1. Take a draw from the probability density function that you specified for the 'taste' coefficients. That is, take a draw from $f(\beta | \theta)$ and label the draw $\beta^r$, for $r=1$ representing the first draw.

2. Calculate $L_n(\beta^r)$. (The conditional probability.)

3. Repeat many times, for $r=2,...,R$.

4. Average the results

Then the formula for the simulation look like the following,

$\tilde{P}_{ni} = \frac {\sum_{r} L_{ni}(\beta^r)} {R}$

where R is the total number of draws taken from the distribution, and r is one draw.

Once this is done you will have a value for the probability of each alternative i for each respondent n.

== See also ==
- Discrete choice
