= Jonathan Feinstein =

American economist

- Born: Jonathan S. Feinstein; 1960 (age 64–65)
- Occupation: Economist

Jonathan S. Feinstein (born 1960) is an American economist, currently the John G. Searle Professor at Yale School of Management. He is the author of The Nature of Creative Development (Stanford) 2006 and Creativity in Large-Scale Contexts (Stanford Business Books) 2023, which won the 2025 Axiom Business Book Awards Gold Medal in the Innovation / Business Intelligence category. His approach to creativity has been featured in Fast Company and Business Week. He studies creativity from the viewpoint of individuality and paths of creative development, as well as the creative development of fields. He designed both the Innovator core course and the Math Camp pre-program for Yale. His math camp has been featured in the Wall Street Journal.
