= Hans Monderman =

Dutch road traffic engineer and innovator

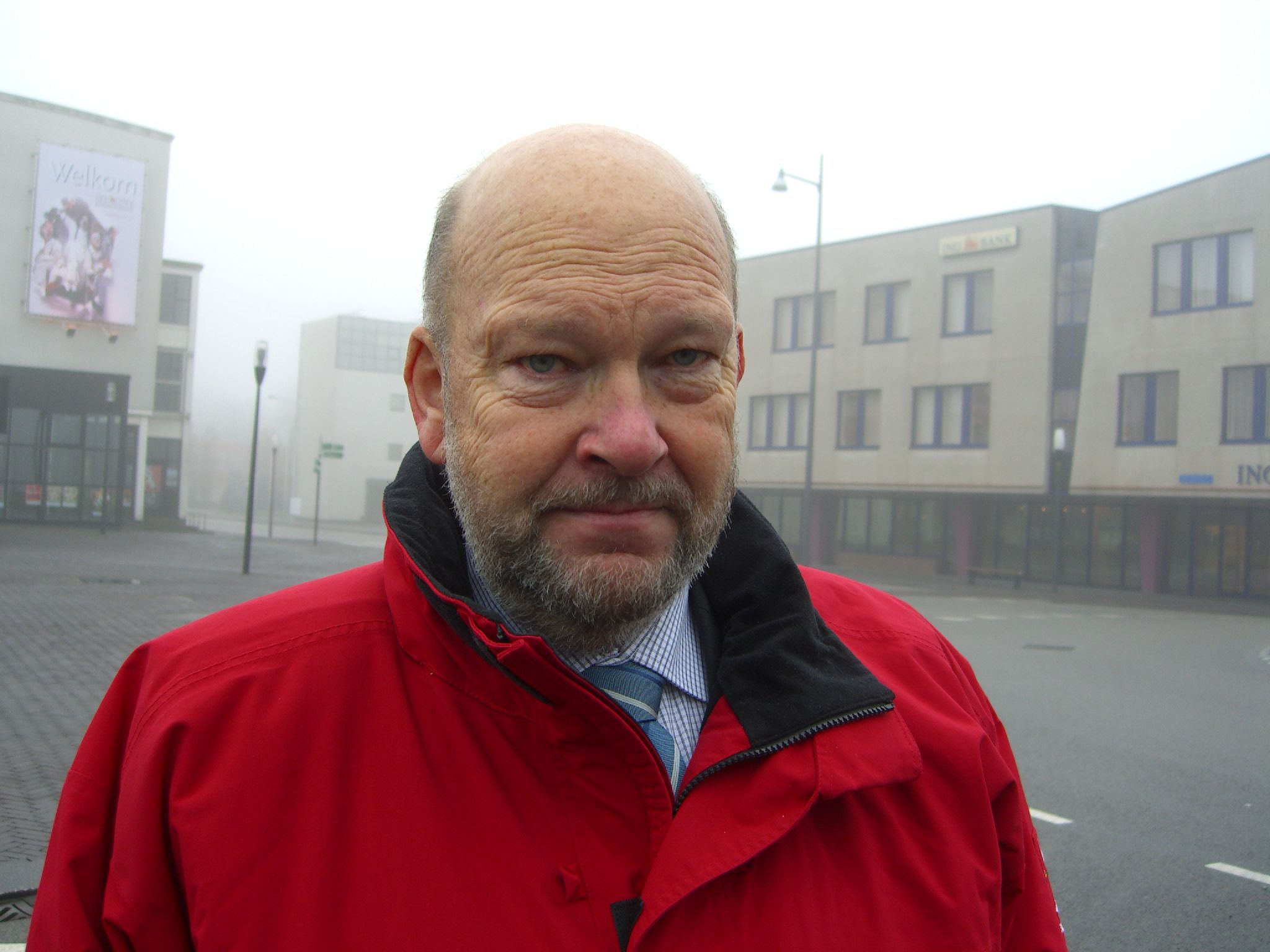
- Monderman in 2006
- Born: 19 November 1945; Leeuwarden, Friesland, Netherlands
- Died: 7 January 2008 (aged 62)
- Occupation: Traffic engineer
- Known for: Shared space, road engineering

Hans Monderman (19 November 1945 – 7 January 2008) was a Dutch road traffic engineer and innovator. He was recognised for radically challenging the criteria used to evaluate engineering solutions for street design. His work compelled transportation planners and highway engineers to look afresh at the way people and technology relate to each other.

His design approach was based on the concept of "shared space", an urban design approach that seeks to minimise demarcations between vehicle traffic and pedestrians, often by removing features such as kerbs, road surface markings, traffic signs, and regulations. Monderman found that traffic efficiency and safety improved when the street and surrounding public space was redesigned to encourage each person to negotiate their movement directly with others.

== Shared space ==
Monderman took it as a given that for several generations, motorised traffic will remain an essential feature of European economies and their spatial fabric; in effect, he has taken this as his technical and policy target—a problem that simply will not go away. Against this background, he reviewed technologies and practices of street design, and stripped away those he felt insufficient or counterproductive. One of the better known of Monderman's accomplishments is the Dutch Woonerf, or "Living Street" project, which originated from a basically unplanned citizen initiative in Delft in 1968.

== Career highlights ==
- 1969: Province of Friesland, civil engineer project leader infrastructure constructions and controller traffic safety
- 1979 consultant traffic safety at Regional Traffic Safety Commission (accident analysis, road engineering, speed reduction measures); from then on developing and bringing into practice on several spots in province of Friesland shared space approach
- 1996 part-time traffic planner municipality of Smallingerland (Friesland)
- 1999 to 2002 policy consultant province of Groningen (integration of traffic and landscape)
- 2002 programme manager of integration programme (spatial, landscape, and traffic planning) in Drenthe

== Honours ==
Monderman received an Honorary Doctor of Philosophy degree in traffic planning for outstanding achievements in the fields of traffic engineering, urban design, and project management.

In 2005 he was nominated for the World Technology Award for the Environment and gave a presentation on his work in a speech to the formal conference and awards ceremony in October 2005 in San Francisco.
