= Polytomous choice =

Concept in economics

In economics, polytomous choice is a setting (model) with more than two choices; contrast to dichotomous choice. The use of the term polychotomous is also in common usage in the prior research literature; however, polytomous is the more technically correct spelling.
