= Ann Fetter Friedlaender =

American economist

- Born: September 24, 1938; Philadelphia
- Died: October 19, 1992 (aged 54); Boston
- Education: B.A. in Economics at Radcliffe College. PhD at MIT
- Occupations: MIT Professor of Economics and Civil Engineering, MIT Dean of the School of Humanities and Social Sciences
- Board member of: Rand Corporation and Conrail
- Spouse: Stephan Friedlaender
- Children: Lucas Ferdinand and Nathaniel Mark

Ann Fetter Friedlaender (1938–1992) was a noted American economist. Friedlaender held appointments in two MIT departments as Professor of Civil Engineering and Economics for the class of 1941. Dr Friedlaender was seen as an authority in the field of public finance, with a speciality in transportation studies. The first woman to head one of MIT's five schools, she served as Dean of the School of Humanities and Social Science from 1984 to 1990.

== Biography ==
Ann Fetter Friedlaender was born in Philadelphia in 1938. She graduated with a bachelor's degree in economics from Radcliffe College in 1960. She married architect Stephan Friedlaender in December of the same year. Ann had two sons, Lucas Ferdinand and Nathaniel Mark. In 1964, she completed her PhD. at Massachusetts Institute of Technology with Albert Ando as her advisor. After graduation, Friedlaender worked for one year in Finland as a Fulbright lecturer.

Friedlaender returned to the United States and taught at Boston College as a lecturer, receiving a promotion to an assistant professor, and then a promotion to professor from 1965 to 1974. In 1972, Friedlaender became a visiting professor at the MIT Department of Economics. In 1974, she was a professor at MIT's Department of Economics and Civil Engineering. She was appointed chair of the Economics department in 1983, becoming the first woman to head an academic department at MIT. She was named Dean of the School of Humanities and Social Sciences from 1984 to 1990. Friedlaender was also held positions off campus as a director of the Rand Corporation and of Conrail; a member of the American Economic Association, serving on the executive committee for two years; the chair of the Committee on the Status of Women in the Economics Profession (1978–1980; and an associate editor of Transportation Science for 14 years.

Friedlaender died of cancer at Beth Israel Hospital in Boston on October 19, 1992. Her family established a Professorship after her death. Her brother Alexander Fetter, is professor emeritus of Physics and Applied Physics at Stanford University.

== Contribution ==
Friedlaender was a scholar who published many professional and academic articles, influential books, and several monographs. One of the most well-known publications she wrote was The Interstate Highway System, which quickly made her an authority in the field of transportation economics at the age of 27.

Her later works on the public finance and regulations of the public transportation system became fundamentals in these fields, and her analysis was considered in future regulation and policymaking. Her use of econometric modelling on the transport system was innovative for its time.

Friedlaender's work with Spady, Transport Regulation: Equity, Efficiency, and Competition in the Rail and Trucking Industries, raised a lot of attention along with significant policy implications. Also, Friedlaender was very invested in improving learning materials for students. Friedlaender joined John F. Due as the second author and edited the fifth and later editions of Government Finance: Economics of the Public Sector in 1973, helping to improve the classic textbook published in seven editions from 1954 to 1981. The then provost, Professor John M. Deutch, described her as "one of the best deans to have graced MIT in its history," adding, "She is a person of enormous wisdom and her accomplishments for the school have been just as enormous."

Aside from being productive in the academic field, Friedlaender was a member of the American Economic Association and the chair of the Committee on the Status of Women in the Economics Profession. There, she actively provided help and was committed to inspiring more women to choose academic careers and attend graduate school.

== Appointments ==
- Fulbright lecturer, 1964–1965
- Teaching at Boston College, 1965–1974
- Professor at MIT, 1974–1992
- Named Professor at MIT, 1987
- Chair of the Economics Department, 1983
- Dean of the School of Humanities and Social Sciences, 1984–1990
- Chair of the Committee on the Status of Women in the Economics Profession, 1978–1980
- American Economic Association Executive Committee
- American Economic Association Vice President, 1987

== Works and publications ==
- The Interstate Highway System: A Study in Public Investment. Amsterdam: North-Holland, 1965.
- The Dilemma of Freight Transportation Regulation. Washington, DC: Brooking Institution, 1969.
- Government Finance: Economics of the Public Sector (with J.F. Due). 6th ed. Home wood, IL: R.D.Irwin, 1977.
- "A Derived Demand Function for Freight Transportation" (with R.H. Spady). Review of Economics and Statistics 62(3), August 1980:432-41.
- Freight Transport Regulation: Equity, Efficiency, and Competition in the Rail and Trucking Industries (with R.H. Spady). Cambridge, MA: MIT Press, 1981.
- "Rail Costs and Capital Adjustments in a Quest-Regulated Environment" (with E.R. Berndt et al.). Journal of Transport Economics and Policy 27(2), May 1993:131-52.
- "Costs, Technology, and Productivity in the U.S. Automobile Industry". The Bell Journal of Economics 14(1), February 1983:1–20.
