= Ben Hamilton-Baillie =

English architect (1955–2019)

Ben Hamilton-Baillie (4 July 1955 – 3 March 2019) was an urban designer and movement specialist, described as "the leading international expert on the development of shared space". He was the director of his own company, Hamilton-Baillie Associates Ltd., where role he provided consultancy advice on traffic and urban renewal. He taught extensively in the UK and United States.

== Biography ==
Hamilton-Baillie trained as an architect in Cambridge, and worked in London, Hamburg and Turkey before moving to Bristol where he spent 13 years in housing renewal and development. In 1995, he became regional manager for Sustrans, a sustainable transport charity in England. With Sustrans, he helped complete the first phase of the UK's National Cycle Network, and to develop transport initiatives such as ‘Safe Routes to Schools’ and home zones.

Baillie later researched and promoted new approaches to traffic management and street design. He was awarded a Winston Churchill Traveling Fellowship in 2000 which permitted him to visit and report on European and Scandinavian home zones. In 2001, he was a Harvard University Loeb Fellow. He served on the expert team for the European Union project developing “shared space” with projects in Belgium, Denmark, Germany and the Netherlands. He is the author of "Traffic in Villages – A Toolkit for Communities" published by Dorset AONB in 2012. He was lead designer for the regeneration of the Cheshire town of Poynton, involving the redesign of Fountain Place and the removal of the former traffic signals.

He died in March 2019 of cancer, aged 63.
