= Traffic conflict =

Averted road collision

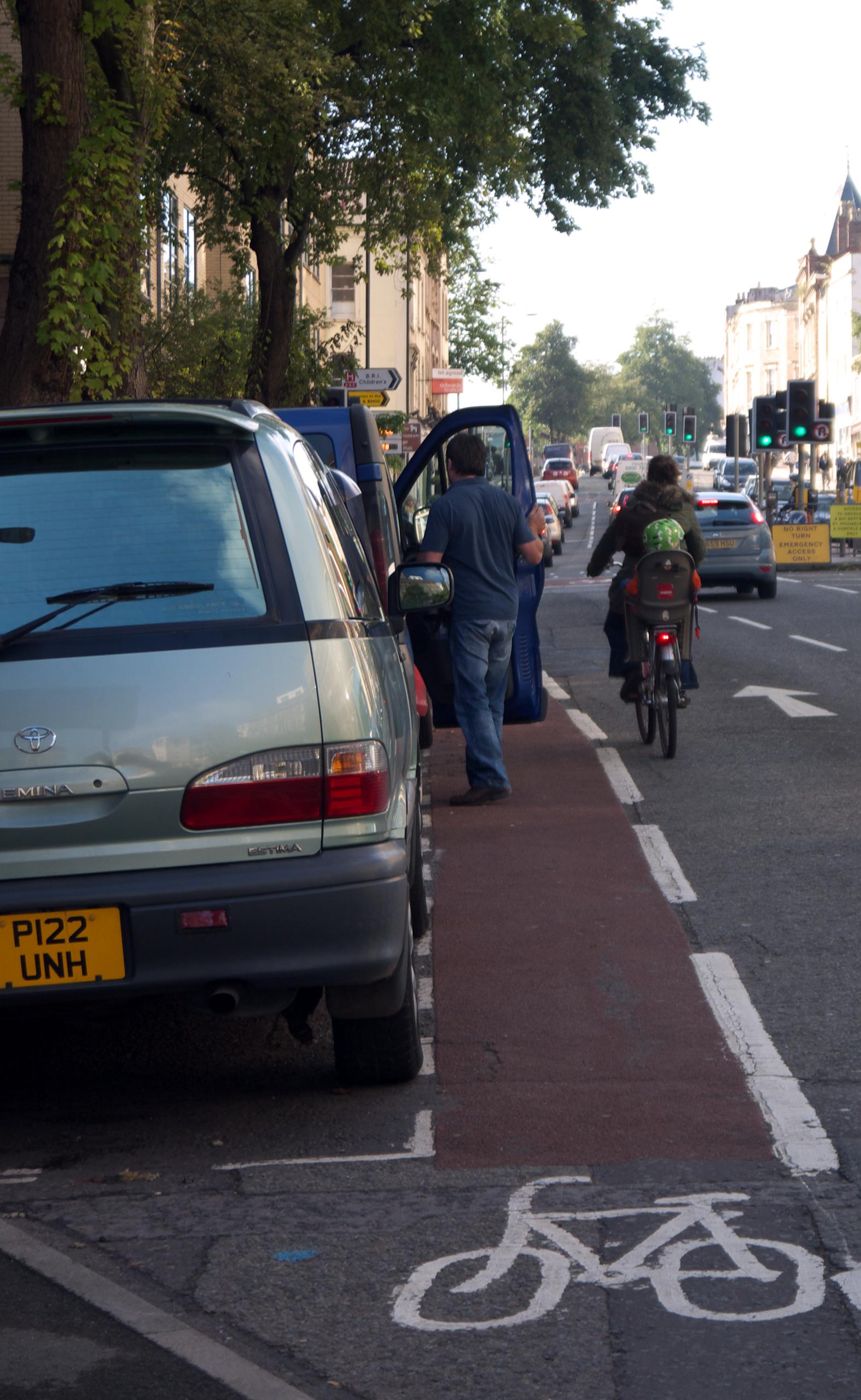
A cyclist moving out of a cycle lane to avoid a collision with the door of a parked vehicle

A traffic conflict is "an observable event which would end in an accident unless one of the involved parties slows down, changes lanes, or accelerates to avoid collision". Traffic conflicts are defined by their time-to-collision, post-encroachment-time, and angle of conflict parameters as well as the vehicles' position in time and space.

Traffic conflicts have typically been used for transportation safety studies, whereby observing and monitoring individual collisions may be impractical, unfeasible, or unsafe. Traffic conflicts are used as traffic collision surrogates, under the assumption that the same factors affecting collision rates also affect conflict rates, in proportion to the conflict severity, termed conflict hierarchy.

The principles of traffic conflicts apply to all modes of transportation involving vehicles operating in a non-guided medium, including motorized vehicles, airplanes, boats, and bicycles.

== By modes of transportation ==
=== Motorized vehicles ===
Most traffic conflicts involving motorized vehicles are observed on highways, usually involving lane changing or sudden changes in vehicle speeds (rear-end collisions), or in intersections, involving a large array of conflict types.

== Methodology ==
2D microsimulation model of a roundabout in a country where traffic drives on the left.

The U.S. Federal Highway Administration-sponsored Safety Surrogate Assessment Model is a tool being developed for the analysis of conflicts using simulated results from traffic modelling, video analytics and microsimulation. Traffic microsimulation models simulate the behaviour of individual vehicles within a predefined road network and are used to predict the likely impact of changes in traffic patterns resulting from changes to traffic flow or from changes to the physical environment. Microsimulation has its greatest strength in modelling congested road networks due to its ability to simulate queueing conditions. Microsimulation models will continue to provide results at high degrees of saturation, up to the point of absolute gridlock. This capability makes these types of models very useful to analyse traffic operations in urban areas and city centers, including interchanges, roundabouts, unsignalized and signalized intersections, signal coordinated corridors, and area networks. Microsimulation also reflects even relatively small changes in the physical environment such as the narrowing of lanes or the relocation of junction stop lines.

== Criticism ==
Some research suggests that the correlation between conflicts and collisions is weak, or can vary from site to site.

Because human observation of conflicts is a complicated process, some argue that a certain amount of subjectivity invalidates traffic conflict analysis involving human observers.
