= Clifford Winston =

Economist

Clifford Winston is an applied microeconomist and senior fellow in the Economic Studies program at the Brookings Institution. He studies microeconomic policy and its impact on government performance, specializing in industrial organization, regulation, and transportation.

== Education and career ==
Winston received his A.B. in economics from the University of California at Berkeley in 1974, his MSc from the London School of Economics in 1975, and his Ph.D. in economics from U.C. Berkeley in 1979.

Prior to joining Brookings, Winston was an associate professor in the Transportation Systems Division of the Massachusetts Institute of Technology’s Department of Civil Engineering. Teaching at both the undergraduate and graduate levels, Winston’s courses included Applied Microeconomic Theory, Advanced Travel Demand Analysis, Applied Econometrics, Public Policy Toward Industry, and Transportation Economics. He also lectured on microeconomic policies at Australian National University and served as a visiting professor at the Institut d'Études Politiques de Paris (Sciences Po), where he taught competition policy.

Winston began working at the Brookings Institution in 1984 as a research associate; he has been a senior fellow since 1986. From 1987 to 1998, Winston was co-editor of the Brookings Papers on Economic Activity: Microeconomics, which publishes innovative analyses on real-word institutions and economic policy with an empirical focus and a pragmatic aim.

== First Thing We Do, Let's Deregulate All the Lawyers ==
First Thing We Do, Let’s Deregulate All the Lawyers (Brookings Press, 2011) is the latest book from Clifford Winston, Robert W. Crandall, and Vikram Maheshri. It analyzes why legal costs are so high and proposes how they can be reduced without sacrificing the quality of legal services. They argue that deregulating entry by individuals and firms into the legal profession will inherently improve lawyers’ performance, as they contend for business in a more competitive environment.

"This is a sobering, intelligent, controversial examination of the role lawyers play in the national economy. Although I disagree with some of the authors’ assumptions and conclusions, the brilliance of their analyses cannot be disputed."—Thomas A. Mesereau Jr., Partner, Mesereau & Yu, LLP, Los Angeles; the lawyer who won the Michael Jackson criminal case

== Published works ==
=== Books ===
- First Thing We Do, Let’s Deregulate All the Lawyers. Washington, DC: The Brookings Institution Press, 2011.
- Last Exit: Privatization and Deregulation of the U.S. Transportation Industry. Washington, DC: The Brookings Institution Press, 2010.
- Aviation Infrastructure Performance: A Study in Comparative Political Economy. Washington, DC: The Brookings Institution, 2008 (co-edited with Gines de Rus).
- Government Failure Versus Market Failure: Microeconomics Policy Research and Government Performance. Washington, DC: The Brookings Institution Press and AEI, 2006.
- Deregulation of Network Industries: What’s Next? Washington, DC: The Brookings Institution Press and AEI, 2006.

=== Selected academic articles ===
- Winston, Clifford (September 2008). "The Efficacy of Information Policy: A Review of Archon Fung, Mary Graham, and David Weil's Full Disclosure: The Perils and Promise of Transparency" (PDF). Journal of Economic Literature. 46 (3): 704–717. doi:10.1257/jel.46.3.704.
- Ashley Langer (2008-10-10). "Toward a Comprehensive Assessment of Road Pricing Accounting for Land Use". Brookings-Wharton Papers on Urban Affairs. 1 (1): 127–175.
- Morrison, Steven A. (2007). "The effect of FAA expenditures on air travel delays" (PDF). Journal of Urban Economics. 63 (2): 669–678. doi:10.1016/j.jue.2007.04.005.
- Morrison, Steven A. (December 2007). "Another Look at Airport Congestion Pricing" (PDF). The American Economic Review. 97 (5): 1970–1977. doi:10.1257/aer.97.5.1970.
- Train, Kenneth E. (November 2007). "Vehicle Choice Behavior and the Declining Market Share of U.S. Automakers" (PDF). International Economic Review. 48 (4): 1469–1496. doi:10.1111/j.1468-2354.2007.00471.x. S2CID 13085087.
- Winston, Clifford; Vikram Maheshri (2006). "On the social desirability of urban rail transit systems" (PDF). Journal of Urban Economics. 62 (2): 362–382. doi:10.1016/j.jue.2006.07.002.

=== Selected op-eds ===
- "Paving the Way for Driverless Cars". Wall Street Journal. 18 July 2012.
- "The Law Firm Business Model Is Dying". Wall Street Journal. 28 May 2012.
- "Why Your Highway Has Potholes". Wall Street Journal. 15 April 2012.
- "Deregulate the Lawyers". The Milken Institute Review. April 2012.
- "Are Law Schools and Bar Exams Necessary?". New York Times. 24 October 2011.
- "Where Did All the Affordable Cars Go?". New York Times. 13 April 2026.
