= Savanta =

British market research consultancy

Savanta Ltd.
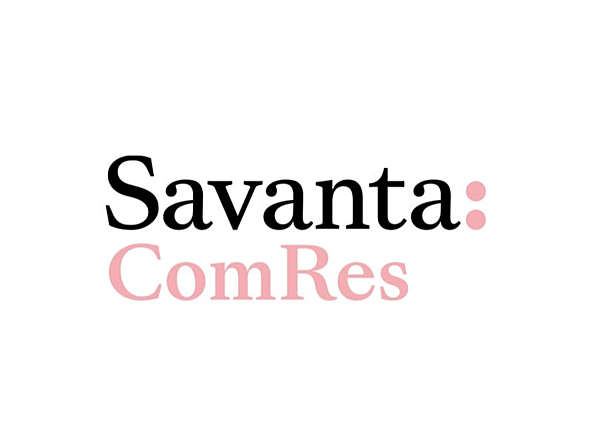
- Type: Private limited company
- Industry: Market research Opinion polling Corporate Communication; Reputation management public policy
- Founded: 2003
- Founders: Andrew Hawkins
- Headquarters: London, England, UK
- Area served: Worldwide
- Website: savanta.com

Savanta is a market research consultancy based in London, England. Established in 2003 as Communicate Research Ltd, then ComRes, it was a founding member of the British Polling Council in 2004, and, by 2016, it was described one of the UK's "most respected" polling companies. In 2022, it became known as Savanta.

The company is prominent in the British media through its regular voting intention polls for ITV News, the Daily Mail, and for its surveys of legislators in Westminster and Brussels. Other media outlets such as The Independent, the BBC, and Sky News also commission Savanta ComRes research.

It has offices in London, Oxford, New York, San Francisco, Toronto, Amsterdam and New Delhi among other locations and works with clients across business, government, and the voluntary sector.

== History ==
Founded by current Chairman Andrew Hawkins in 2003, ComRes originally focused on research in the political sphere. In 2010, it was named Pollster of the Year at the Public Affairs Awards.

In recent years, the business has expanded to develop expertise in a wider range of sectors, including financial services, education, health care, transport, and the voluntary sector.

It won the Market Research Society's Public Policy & Social Research Award in 2014, for its research on behalf of the Grantham Research Institute on Climate Change and the Environment.

The company rebranded as Savanta ComRes in 2019 when it was sold to Savanta for an undisclosed amount.

== Methodology ==
Savanta ComRes uses a range of methodologies to conduct quantitative and qualitative research. These include telephone, face-to-face, and online surveys, focus groups, consultations, and social media monitoring.

As a registered market research agency, Savanta ComRes is exempt from the UK's Telephone Preference Service, and can therefore conduct computer-assisted telephone interviewing (CATI) across the country. It continues to conduct its national voting intention surveys via this methodology.

The company also provides data analytics such as market segmentation, regression analysis, MaxDiff, and conjoint analysis.

== Poll archive ==
The company makes freely available its political voting intention polls on its website along with results from regular surveys.
