= Simalto =

Survey based statistical market research technique

SIMALTO – SImultaneous Multi-Attribute Trade Off – is a survey based statistical technique used in market research that helps determine how people prioritise and value alternative product and/or service options of the attributes that make up individual products or services.

A particular specific application of the method is in political science. It can be applied to predicting which of the alternative combinations of optional service benefits provided by a local authority, state or national government in their annual budget would meet with the ‘maximum’ approval of a target population.

== Survey design ==
SIMALTO is based on creating a matrix of the options that can combine to form the product or service. Each row of the matrix represents an attribute and the matrix columns are the various options (alternative features, levels of service, benefits) of that particular row attribute. Each option is associated with ‘cost points’ which indicates how much more or less that option costs to deliver than the other options on the matrix. The cost points may reflect the actual price in currency, say, of a consumer or industrial product option, or, more commonly in service applications, the relative costs to the supplier of delivering the different benefit options.

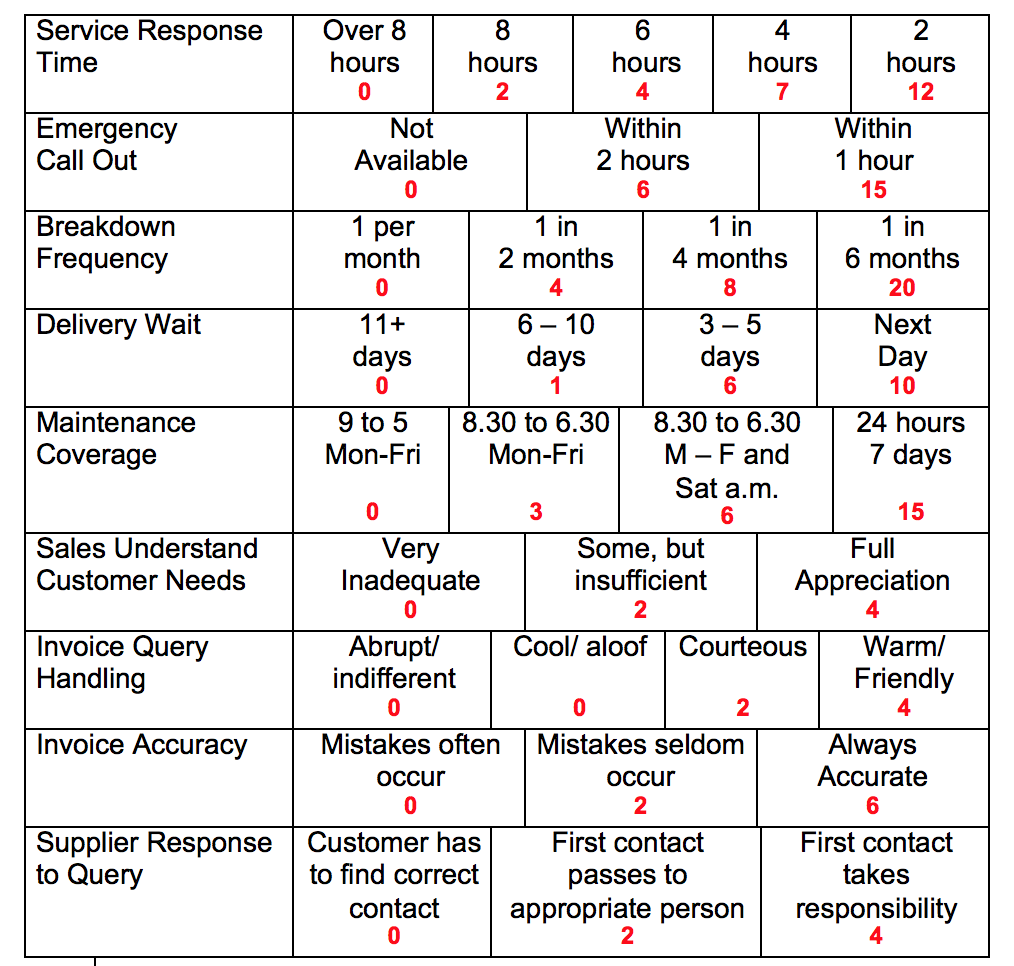
Simalto Matrix example

Example SIMALTO Matrix : To improve from 8 hours service response time to 2 hours would ‘cost’ an extra 10 points. This would be twice the cost of improving from 6–10 days wait for spare parts to a 3-5 day wait.

Respondents complete a series of tasks on this matrix. These may include indicating the option on each row he currently perceives he experiences in the product or service he has now and/or his perception of a rival product or service performance. But the main tasks completed on the matrix are the respondents prioritisation of the options within total ‘constrained’ budgets. The respondent is given a total number of ‘cost points’ which he allocates to the options on the matrix to ‘design’ his preferred total specification within that total given cost constraint – called his first priorities. Then he is given more cost points to ‘improve’ his first budget allocation to show his second priorities. Typically there are a minimum of three prioritisation stages and rarely more than five. These priorities can be used to create market models that estimate potential market share of alternative product or service specifications.

This staged prioritization of options was first developed by John Greene while he was the international market research manager at Rank Xerox in London in the mid-1970s. A simpler questionnaire, where the respondent only allocated a single total budget across many of the various matrix options available, to build his ‘personal specification’, was used by Ford Motor Company in Detroit in the late 1940s. More recently this single stage budget allocation approach has been used by many manufacturers on their web-sites to collect a given respondents preferred specification having been shown the costs of different options. Also this single budget allocation, without the multiple prioritisation stages, is a part of some variants of modern conjoint trade-off analysis. The algorithms required for the modelling predictions of SIMALTO data enabling potential market share calculations and needs-based analysis were first created in the early 1980s, with major improvements and extended capabilities introduced in 2000.

If applicable brand can be regarded as a product attribute, but for SIMALTO market simulations, brand value information is not collected in the same way as the trade-off options of the product or service specification. Rather a variant of Brand-Price Trade-Off is used. Total specification price or cost is not treated as one of many specification variables, as in conjoint studies, but treated mainly as a constraint.

SIMALTO Modelling is part of the set of trade-off analysis tools used for systematic quantified analysis of decisions. These tools include the various forms of conjoint trade-off, discrete choice modelling and brand-price trade off approaches.

== Survey administration ==
The visual presentation of the matrix of attributes and their options is the key component of SIMALTO studies. Originally these were presented on paper, often in A3 size in Europe or ‘Legal’ size in the USA. The larger than usual paper size was required to comfortably show all options simultaneously to the respondent. The simultaneous element ensures trade-off priorities are collected in the context of the total specification and each options cost portion of the constrained total cost is always ‘in view’. Respondents used different coloured pens to indicate their different stages of priorities. The questionnaire can be presented by an interviewer face-to-face with the respondent, or in a ‘focus-group’ situation where all participants individually completed the various SIMALTO stages under the guidance of a single moderator.

The limit on the number of attributes is not constrained by mathematical issues, but rather dictated by common sense of what a respondent can sensibly deal with in a particular product field and in a reasonable time period. Up to 20/25 attributes, each with up to 4 or 5 options is possible. However, in studies that have fairly simple options with short descriptions of alternatives, e.g. banking charge cards or contract options for telecoms services, up to 35 attributes can be included. Studies including attributes where differences between options require more detailed explanations, perhaps with illustrations, mean that 15-20 attributes might be a practical limit.

Since 2000 the majority of SIMALTO studies have been completed via the web. This reduces data collection costs considerably but has the disadvantage that the whole of a matrix with 10 or more attributes cannot be viewed simultaneously without scrolling the matrix on the screen. This disadvantage means that 20 is a realistic maximum attribute number on the web, unless respondents are sufficiently motivated (by product interest and/or incentives) to spend longer than 20 minutes completing the questionnaire.

== SIMALTO analysis ==
With SIMALTO approach the data collected is directly useful in itself. The sequential process of building up a specification reflects real life evaluation of products or services. It mirrors respondent decisions such as ‘what options must I have, what options are nice to have, what are they worth to me and which options are unnecessary for me’. Simply counting how many respondents choose a particular option in preference to another provides an unambiguous quantification of each option's relative popularity.

However this direct data is insufficient to deduce the most popular total specification when there are more than 5 or 6 attributes, or to predict preference shares between competing specifications at different prices/costs. Therefore, to satisfy these requirements modelling capabilities must be applied to the raw SIMALTO data. The method most frequently used is based on expert system rules linked to neural net logic and genetic algorithm theory. Examples of these rules applied to competing specifications facing an individual respondent:

- For similarly priced specifications, the one that contains more of the respondents high value priority options and fewer of his low value priority options is likely to be the one most preferred.
- The specification that has the fewest options he considered to be ‘unacceptable’ (if asked on the questionnaire) will be preferred to those with more unacceptable options.
- The specification that is priced (costed) nearest the price he wanted to pay for this product is likely to be preferred to those that are either over-specified, and therefore likely to be too expensive, or those that are under-specified and therefore unlikely to satisfy his needs.
- The SIMALTO modeling analysis expects that the respondent will seek the best ‘bargain’. That is the difference between the value of the specification to him compared to the price it is sold at.

Application of rules such as these enables predictions of potential market shares between competing specifications, determination of those options in an ‘optimum’ specification at a given total specification price/cost, a hierarchy of preference for each option relative to other options and for ‘needs-based’ cluster analysis which can find groups of respondents with similar values/priorities.

== Advantages and disadvantages ==
=== Advantages ===
- The questionnaire sequence engages the respondent and ‘educates’ him if required about competing options/benefits availability and their likely relative prices/costs. The respondent is not completing a ‘tick-box’ survey simply asking for ‘top-of-the-mind’ response.
- Because the respondent evaluates each option on many occasions and the modeling uses these several data inputs, the variance of reported findings is less than usual with individual observations.
- The SIMALTO modelling analysis is ‘cause and effect’ based and does not rely on equations that might make statistical demands on data distribution and attribute independence assumed by, but may not be realised by, regression based trade-off questionnaire approaches. Simulation preference predictions are made for each respondent individually – there is no averaging of forecasts across respondents required by methods that can only show a subset of all the options to an individual respondent when there are more than 7 or 8 attributes.
- Needs-based cluster analysis is carried out directly on individual respondents and does not require complex statistical Bayesian analyses.
- Product price or service cost is not treated as a trade-off variable but rather price and cost are more considered to be a constraint, better reflecting the real-life situation.
- Brand value, if included in a survey, is not simply treated as another trade-off attribute. In many product fields most major manufacturers can produce most of the options on the SIMALTO matrix, so to trade off a brand with one or more options is not realistic. But brand does have a relative value (due to brand image factors, promotion, availability, customer inertia etc.) and so brand value is included in the forecasting process directly on its own terms.
- Research findings can be directly linked to raw data. The direct un-modelled SIMATO data can be used to explain why the simulation forecast was as provided.

=== Disadvantages ===
- Between 5% and 10% respondents find the initial appearance of many attributes and options rather daunting which can deter them from completing the survey. A one-on-one interviewer/respondent situation may help resolve this, but for web based surveys a helpful interviewer is usually unavailable.
- For a product or service with many features, designing the Simalto matrix can be time-consuming.
- With too many options, in a web-based survey some respondents may not read all the possible options as they will have to scroll down.
- Respondents may feel forced to think about issues they would otherwise not pay attention to.

== Practical applications ==
SIMALTO has been used in a wide range of product fields – it is suitable wherever there are choices to be made between product options or levels of service at different prices/costs. Applications in consumer durables, financial services, transport and distribution, utilities, telecoms and medical equipment have been the most frequent, together with the specialised application in budget allocation optimisation for local and national government.

== See also ==
- Advertising
- Marketing
- Marketing research
- New product development
- Quantitative marketing research
- TURF analysis
- Value-based pricing

== Conferences ==
- John Green, SIMALTO – A technique for improved product design and marketing, ESOMAR conference, Oslo 1977
- J. Jones and G. Miles, Rail Roading Ahead: applying an established approach to a new field, Southgate P., Market Research Society conference 1982
- John Green, SIMALTO computer assisted product design and marketing planning, IMRA conference May 1986
- J. Crane and P. Macfarlane, The only real measure of customer satisfaction is market share, ESOMAR conference, Prague 1992
- John Green, IMRA's Advice to the next Chancellor of the Exchequer, IMRA conference May 1986
- John Green, Optimising Product Specification and Customer Services using SIMALTO, ITMAR conference Brussels 1989
- J. Green and E. Goldsmith and C. Parish, The SIMALTO approach to Optimal Product Specification, American Marketing Association, Advanced Research Techniques Conference, Colorado 1991
