= Joan Walker (disambiguation) =

Joan Walker may refer to:

- Joan Walker (1908–1997), Canadian writer
- Joan L. Walker, American transportation engineer
- Joan Walker (Coronation Street), fictional television character
