= 2IFC =

2IFC may refer to:

- Two-interval forced choice, a psychophysical method
- Two International Finance Centre (Hong Kong), the second tallest building in Hong Kong
