= Sawtooth Software =

Computer software company based in Provo, Utah, USA

Sawtooth Software, Inc.
- Type: Private
- Industry: Research Software
- Founded: Sun Valley, Idaho, United States (1983)
- Founder: Richard M. Johnson
- Headquarters: Provo, Utah, United States
- Products: ACA; ACBC; CBC; CBC/HB; CBC Latent Class; CCEA; MaxDiff; MBC
- Website: sawtoothsoftware.com

Sawtooth Software, Inc. is a computer software company based in Provo, Utah, United States. The company provides survey software tools, and specializes in conjoint analysis.

According to the American Marketing Association, Sawtooth Software was ranked fourth in 2005 among software used in market research (after SPSS, Microsoft Excel, and SAS System).

== History ==
In the late 1960s, Rich Johnson, who was then an employee of Market Facts, Inc., developed a technique they called "Tradeoff Analysis". It consisted of questioning respondents about various concepts composed of multiple attributes and comparing their responses to the different concepts. In 1971, Paul Green published an article titled "Conjoint Measurement for Quantifying Judgmental Data". When Johnson became aware of Green's research, he identified his technique as a variety of conjoint analysis.

In the mid 70's, Johnson co-founded the John Morton Company in part to apply computer technology to Tradeoff Analysis. Johnson purchased an Apple II and began to program interviews for use on client projects. Each project was programmed custom for the client. During this time Johnson was fascinated by the ability of the computer to facilitate the collection of respondent data.

In 1982 Johnson left the John Morton Company and founded Sawtooth Software to pursue creating generalized software for use in marketing research.

== Products ==
Sawtooth Software has created products for traditional conjoint analysis, as well as discrete choice analysis and other forms of conjoint. In addition there are non-conjoint products involving interviewing, perceptual mapping, and cluster analysis.

=== Conjoint Techniques ===
- Adaptive Conjoint Analysis (ACA)
- Adaptive Choice Based Conjoint (ACBC)
- Choice Based Conjoint (CBC)
- Conjoint Value Analysis (CVA)
- Maximum Difference Scaling (MaxDiff)
- Menu-Based Choice (MBC)

=== Analysis Techniques ===
- Hierarchical Bayes (HB)
- Latent Class (LC)
- Logit
- Ordinary Least Squares (OLS)
- Convergent Cluster & Ensemble Analysis (CCEA)
- Composite Product Mapping (CPM) (retired)

=== General Interviewing Packages ===
- Lighthouse Studio
- Discover
- Ci3 (retired)

== Relationships ==
Sawtooth Software maintains relationships with academics and market research organizations such as the American Marketing Association and ESOMAR. Researchers developing new interviewing techniques such as Maximum Difference (Best Worst) have used Sawtooth Software to assist in constructing their projects.

In addition to producing products, Sawtooth Software has also hosted a research conference every 18 months in the United States since 1987. The conference is not a sales event, and speakers with contrary opinions or competing products attend and present.
