= Random utility model =

Economic model of personal preferences

In economics, a random utility model (RUM), also called stochastic utility model, is a mathematical description of the preferences of a person, whose choices are not deterministic, but depend on a random state variable.

== Background ==
A basic assumption in classic economics is that the choices of a rational person choices are guided by a preference relation, which can usually be described by a utility function. When faced with several alternatives, the rational person will choose the alternative with the highest utility. The utility function is not visible; however, by observing the choices made by the person, we can "reverse-engineer" his utility function. This is the goal of revealed preference theory.

In practice, however, people are not rational. Ample empirical evidence shows that, when faced with the same set of alternatives, people may make different choices. To an outside observer, their choices may appear random.

One way to model this behavior is called stochastic rationality. It is assumed that each agent has an unobserved state, which can be considered a random variable. Given that state, the agent behaves rationally. In other words: each agent has, not a single preference-relation, but a distribution over preference-relations (or utility functions).

== The representation problem ==
Block and Marschak presented the following problem. Suppose we are given as input, a set of choice probabilities P_{a,B}, describing the probability that an agent chooses alternative a from the set B. We want to rationalize the agent's behavior by a probability distribution over preference relations. That is: we want to find a distribution such that, for all pairs a,B given in the input, P_{a,B} = Prob[a is weakly preferred to all alternatives in B]. What conditions on the set of probabilities P_{a,B} guarantee the existence of such a distribution?

Falmagne solved this problem for the case in which the set of alternatives is finite: he proved that a probability distribution exists iff a set of polynomials derived from the choice-probabilities, denoted Block-Marschak polynomials, are nonnegative. His solution is constructive, and provides an algorithm for computing the distribution.

Barbera and Pattanaik extend this result to settings in which the agent may choose sets of alternatives, rather than just singletons.

=== Uniqueness ===
Block and Marschak proved that, when there are at most 3 alternatives, the random utility model is unique ("identified"); however, when there are 4 or more alternatives, the model may be non-unique. For example, we can compute the probability that the agent prefers w to x (w>x), and the probability that y>z, but may not be able to know the probability that both w>x and y>z. There are even distributions with disjoint supports, which induce the same set of choice probabilities.

Some conditions for uniqueness were given by Falmagne. Turansick presents two characterizations for the existence of a unique random utility representation.

== Models ==
There are various RUMs, which differ in the assumptions on the probability distributions of the agent's utility, A popular RUM was developed by Luce and Plackett.

The Plackett-Luce model was applied in econometrics, for example, to analyze automobile prices in market equilibrium. It was also applied in machine learning and information retrieval. It was also applied in social choice, to analyze an opinion poll conducted during the Irish presidential election. Efficient methods for expectation-maximization and Expectation propagation exist for the Plackett-Luce model.

== Application to social choice ==
RUMs can be used not only for modeling the behavior of a single agent, but also for decision-making among a society of agents. One approach to social choice, first formalized by Condorcet's jury theorem, is that there is a "ground truth" - a true ranking of the alternatives. Each agent in society receives a noisy signal of this true ranking. The best way to approach the ground truth is using maximum likelihood estimation: construct a social ranking which maximizes the likelihood of the set of individual rankings.

Condorcet's original model assumes that the probabilities of agents' mistakes in pairwise comparisons are independent and identically distributed: all mistakes have the same probability p. This model has several drawbacks:

- It ignores the strength of agents' expressed preferences. An agent who prefers a "much more than" b and an agent who prefers a "a little more than b" are treated the same.
- It allows for cyclic preferences. There is a positive probability that an agent will prefer a to b, b to c, and c to a.
- The maximum likelihood estimator - which is the Kemeny–Young method - is hard to compute (it is $\Theta^P_2$-complete).

RUM provides an alternative model: there is a ground-truth vector of utilities; each agent draws a utility for each alternative, based on a probability distribution whose mean value is the ground-truth. This model captures the strength of preferences, and rules out cyclic preferences. Moreover, for some common probability distributions (particularly, the Plackett-Luce model), the maximum likelihood estimators can be computed efficiently.

== Generalizations ==
Joan L. Walker and Moshe Ben-Akiva generalize the classic RUM in several ways, aiming to improve the accuracy of forecasts:

- Flexible Disturbances: allowing a richer covariance structure, estimating unobserved heterogeneity, and random parameters;
- Latent Variables: explicitly representing the formation and effects of unseen constructs, such as perceptions and attitudes;
- Latent Classes: capturing hidden segmentation in terms of taste parameters, choice sets, and decision protocols;
- Combining Revealed Preferences and Stated Preferences: to combine advantages of these two data types.

Blavatzkyy studies stochastic utility theory based on choices between lotteries. The input is a set of choice probabilities, which indicate the likelihood that the agent choose one lottery over the other.
