= V. Srinivasan =

American academic marketing scholar

V. "Seenu" Srinivasan
- Born: June 5, 1944
- Citizenship: American
- Education: IIT Madras; Carnegie Mellon University
- Scientific career
- Institutions: Stanford Graduate School of Business
- Thesis: An Operator Theory of Parametric Programming for the Transportation Problem: With Management Science Applications (1972)

V. "Seenu" Srinivasan is an American scholar in the field of marketing science. He is the Adams Distinguished Professor of Management, Emeritus at the Stanford Graduate School of Business, Stanford University. Srinivasan is known for his research on market research and conjoint analysis. Srinivasan received his bachelor's degree in Mechanical Engineering from the Indian Institute of Technology, Madras. He worked for two years as a production-planning engineer at Larsen & Toubro, Mumbai prior to joining Carnegie-Mellon University where he received his MS and PhD in industrial administration.

== Education ==
Srinivasan received his Bachelor of Technology degree in Mechanical Engineering from the Indian Institute of Technology Madras, in 1966. He completed his bachelor's degree with the highest distinction possible, President of India Gold Medalist. He received his Master of Science and PhD degrees from Carnegie Mellon University, Graduate School of Industrial Administration in 1971.

== Research ==
Srinivasan's early research was in operations research, in particular, on transportation and related problems. He is well known for his contributions to conjoint analysis. In fact, the name conjoint analysis was coined by him and the late Prof. Paul Green in their 1978 Journal of Consumer Research paper. He co-developed the LINMAP and ASEMAP estimation methods for conjoint analysis. He is also known for his contributions to the theory of salesforce compensation plans, measurement of brand equity, optimal product positioning, and market structuring (the nature of substitutability among brands in a product category).

== Recognition ==
Srinivasan is a Fellow of the American Marketing Association, Institute for Operations Research and the Management Sciences (INFORMS), and the INFORMS Society for Marketing Science (ISMS). He has received several major research career awards in quantitative marketing: Parlin, Churchill, Converse, and Weaver awards; in addition, he has won ten best research paper awards. The American Marketing Association has established the “Seenu Srinivasan Young Scholar Award in Quantitative Marketing” awarded each year.
