= Moshe Ben-Akiva =

Israeli-American transport engineer and economist

- משה בן־עקיבא
- Born: Moshe Emanuel Ben-Akiva
- Known for: Discrete-choice theory; DynaMIT traffic simulator
- Awards: IATBR Lifetime Achievement Award (2006); Jules Dupuit Prize (2007); IEEE ITS Outstanding Application Award (2011); INFORMS Robert Herman Award (2017)

Academic background
- Education: Technion – Israel Institute of Technology (BS); MIT (SM, PhD)
- Thesis: 'Discrete-choice models of trip generation and destination choice' (1973)

Academic work
- Discipline: Transportation systems analysis, econometrics
- Institutions: Massachusetts Institute of Technology
- Doctoral students: Joan L. Walker
- Notable works: Discrete Choice Analysis (1985)
- Website: www.its.mit.edu

Moshe Emanuel Ben-Akiva is an Israeli-American engineer who holds the Edmund K. Turner Professorship of Civil and Environmental Engineering at the Massachusetts Institute of Technology (MIT). He is noted for pioneering discrete-choice methods in travel-demand modelling and for co-creating DynaMIT, a real-time traffic-management simulation platform.

== Early life and education ==
Ben-Akiva moved to the United States, obtaining an SM in 1971 and a PhD in transportation systems in 1973 from MIT. His doctoral research laid the foundations for the textbook Discrete Choice Analysis.

== Academic career ==
Immediately after completing his doctorate, Ben-Akiva joined the MIT faculty as an assistant professor; he was promoted to full professor in 1981 and named Edmund K. Turner Professor in 1996. He founded and directs MIT’s Intelligent Transportation Systems Laboratory, whose DynaMIT software is used for real-time traffic prediction and was recognised with the IEEE Intelligent Transportation Systems Outstanding Application Award.

Ben-Akiva has supervised more than fifty doctoral dissertations and teaches graduate subjects in discrete-choice analysis, demand modelling and dynamic traffic assignment.

== Research contributions ==
Working at the interface of engineering and economics, Ben-Akiva introduced random-utility models that underpin modern activity-based demand forecasting. His subsequent integration of choice models with dynamic traffic assignment led to the microsimulation tools MITSIM and DynaMIT, which combine real-time sensor data with behavioural models to forecast congestion and test control strategies. Since the 2010s his group has blended machine-learning techniques with discrete choice to improve forecasts for on-demand mobility and urban freight systems.

== Honours ==
- Member of the National Academy of Engineering (2025)
- Lifetime Achievement Award, International Association for Travel Behaviour Research (2006)
- Jules Dupuit Prize, World Conference on Transport Research Society (2007)
- IEEE Intelligent Transportation Systems Society Outstanding Application Award for DynaMIT (2011)
- Robert Herman Lifetime Achievement Award in Transportation Science, INFORMS (2017)
- Honorary doctorates from Université Lumière Lyon 2 (1992), University of the Aegean (2000), KTH Royal Institute of Technology (2008) and University of Antwerp (2010)

== Selected publications ==
- Ben-Akiva, M. & Lerman, S. R. (1985). Discrete Choice Analysis: Theory and Application to Travel Demand. MIT Press.
- Ben-Akiva, M., Meersman, H. & Van de Voorde, E. (eds.) Freight Transport Modelling. Emerald, 2013.
- Ben-Akiva, M., McFadden, D. & Train, K. (2019). “Foundations of stated-preference elicitation.” Foundations and Trends in Econometrics, 10(1-2), 1–144.
