= Joan L. Walker =

American civil engineer

Joan Leslie Walker is an American civil engineer whose research focuses on behavior analysis and choice modelling in transportation planning. She works in the University of California, Berkeley Department of Civil and Environmental Engineering as department chair and Margaret Lin Professor.

== Education and career ==
Walker grew up in Davis, California, where her father was a civil engineer. She became a civil engineering student at the University of California, Berkeley, graduating in 1991. She continued her studies in civil and environmental engineering at the Massachusetts Institute of Technology (MIT), where she received a master's degree in 1994. After three years in industry as a transportation analyst, she returned to MIT to complete her Ph.D. in 2001. Her dissertation, Extended Discrete Choice Models: Integrated Framework, Flexible Error Structures and Latent Variables, was supervised by Moshe Ben-Akiva.

She became an assistant professor of geography and the environment at Boston University in 2004, while continuing to hold a research affiliate and lecturer position at MIT until 2008. In 2008, she moved to the University of California, Berkeley. She was promoted to associate professor in 2012 and full professor in 2016. She became department chair in 2023.

== Recognition ==
Walker received the 2007 Presidential Early Career Award for Scientists and Engineers, "for her outstanding research and educational activities that will contribute to understanding the multi-contextual approach to behavioral modeling for improved transportation planning". She was the 2020 recipient of the Zephyr Leadership Award of the Zephyr Foundation.
