= Choice set =

A choice set is a finite collection of available options selected from a larger theoretical decision space. For example, a consumer has thousands of conceivable alternatives when purchasing a car, far more than they could reasonably be expected to evaluate. As such they will often narrow their search to only vehicles of a certain make, or within a specific price range. By reducing the choice set to a manageable number of alternatives, people are able to make complex decisions between theoretically infinite alternatives in a practical time frame. Choice sets are often used in psychological and market research to make data collection and evaluation more manageable, or to make direct comparisons between a specific set of choices.

== Choice task ==
The respondent is asked a choice task. Usually this is which of the alternatives they prefer. In this example, the Choice task is 'forced'. An 'unforced' choice would allow the respondents to also select 'Neither'. The choice task is used as the dependent variable in the resulting choice model.

== Example of a choice set ==
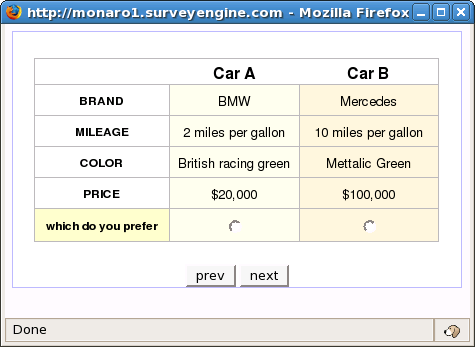
Example produced using SurveyEngine

A choice set has the following elements:

- Alternatives: A number of hypothetical alternatives, Car A and Car B in this example. There may be one or more Alternatives including the 'None' Alternative.
- Attributes : The attributes of the alternatives ideally are mutually exclusive and independent. When this is not possible, attributes are nested.
- Levels: Each Attribute has a number of possible levels that the attributes may range over. The specific levels that are shown are driven by an experimental design. Levels are discrete, even in the case that the attribute is a scalar such as price. In this case, the levels are discretized evenly along the range of allowable values.
