= Conjoint analysis =

Survey-based statistical technique

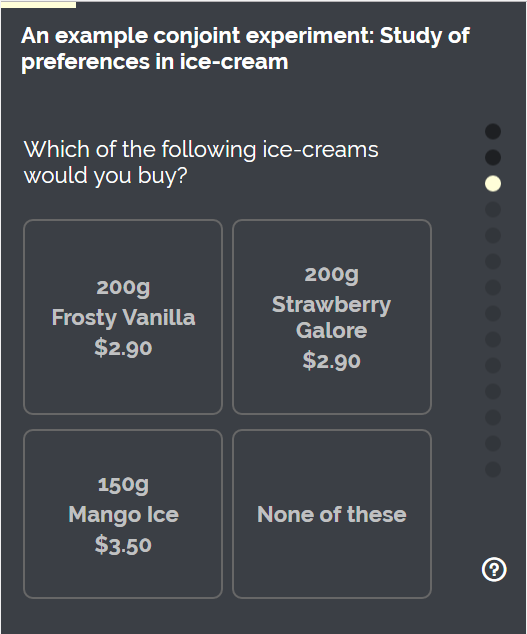
Example choice-based conjoint analysis survey with application to marketing (investigating preferences in ice-cream)

Conjoint analysis is a survey-based statistical technique used in market research that helps determine how people value different attributes (feature, function, benefits) that make up an individual product or service.

The objective of conjoint analysis is to determine the influence of a set of attributes on respondent choice or decision making. In a conjoint experiment, a controlled set of potential products or services, broken down by attribute, is shown to survey respondents. By analyzing how respondents choose among the products, the respondents' valuation of the attributes making up the products or services can be determined. These implicit valuations (utilities or part-worths) can be used to create market models that estimate market share, revenue and even profitability of new designs.

Conjoint analysis originated in mathematical psychology and was developed by marketing professor Paul E. Green at the Wharton School of the University of Pennsylvania. Other prominent conjoint analysis pioneers include professor V. "Seenu" Srinivasan of Stanford University who developed a linear programming (LINMAP) procedure for rank ordered data as well as a self-explicated approach, and Jordan Louviere (University of Iowa) who invented and developed choice-based approaches to conjoint analysis and related techniques such as best–worst scaling.

Today it is used in many of the social sciences and applied sciences including marketing, product management, and operations research. It is used frequently in testing customer acceptance of new product designs, in assessing the appeal of advertisements and in service design. It has been used in product positioning, but there are some who raise problems with this application of conjoint analysis.

Conjoint analysis techniques may also be referred to as multiattribute compositional modelling, discrete choice modelling, or stated preference research, and are part of a broader set of trade-off analysis tools used for systematic analysis of decisions. These tools include Brand Price Trade-off, Simalto, and mathematical approaches such as AHP, PAPRIKA, evolutionary algorithms or rule-developing experimentation.

== Conjoint design ==
A product or service is described in terms of a number of attributes. For example, a television may have attributes of screen size, screen format, brand, price and so on. Each attribute can then be broken down into a number of levels. For instance, levels for screen format may be LED, LCD, or Plasma.

Respondents are shown a set of products, prototypes, mock-ups, or pictures created from a combination of levels from all or some of the constituent attributes and asked to choose from, rank or rate the products they are shown. Each example is similar enough that consumers will see them as close substitutes but dissimilar enough that respondents can clearly determine a preference. Each example is composed of a unique combination of product features. The data may consist of individual ratings, rank orders, or choices among alternative combinations.

Conjoint design involves four different steps:

1. Determine the type of study
2. Identify the relevant attributes
3. Specify the attributes' levels
4. Design questionnaire

=== 1. Determine the type of study ===
There are different types of studies that may be designed:

- Ranking-based conjoint
- Rating-based conjoint
- Choice-based conjoint

=== 2. Identify the relevant attributes ===
Attributes in conjoint analysis should:

- be relevant to managerial decision-making,
- have varying levels in real life,
- be expected to influence preferences,
- be clearly defined and communicable,
- preferably not exhibit strong correlations (price and brand are an exception),
- consist of at least two levels.

=== 3. Specify the attributes' levels ===
Levels of attributes should be:

- unambiguous,
- mutually exclusive,
- realistic.

=== 4. Design questionnaire ===
As the number of combinations of attributes and levels increases the number of potential profiles increases exponentially. Consequently, fractional factorial design is commonly used to reduce the number of profiles to be evaluated, while ensuring enough data are available for statistical analysis, resulting in a carefully controlled set of "profiles" for the respondent to consider.

== Earliest form and drawbacks ==
The earliest forms of conjoint analysis starting in the 1970s were what are known as Full Profile studies, in which a small set of attributes (typically 4 to 5) were used to create profiles that were shown to respondents, often on individual cards. Respondents then ranked or rated these profiles. Using relatively simple dummy variable regression analysis the implicit utilities for the levels could be calculated that best reproduced the ranks or ratings as specified by respondents. Two drawbacks were seen in these early designs.

Firstly, the number of attributes in use was heavily restricted. With large numbers of attributes, the consideration task for respondents becomes too large and even with fractional factorial designs the number of profiles for evaluation can increase rapidly. In order to use more attributes (up to 30), hybrid conjoint techniques were developed that combined self-explication (rating or ranking of levels and attributes) followed by conjoint tasks. Both paper-based and adaptive computer-aided questionnaires became options starting in the 1980s. Another approach is partial-profile conjoint, in which only a subset of attributes is shown in each profile. Research suggests that respondents may infer omitted attribute levels from previously viewed profiles, producing learning and order effects that can alter estimated attribute importance.

The second drawback was that ratings or rankings of profiles were unrealistic and did not link directly to behavioural theory. In real-life situations, buyers choose among alternatives rather than ranking or rating them. Jordan Louviere pioneered an approach that used only a choice task which became the basis of choice-based conjoint analysis and discrete choice analysis. This stated preference research is linked to econometric modeling and can be linked to revealed preference where choice models are calibrated on the basis of real rather than survey data. Originally, choice-based conjoint analysis was unable to provide individual-level utilities and researchers developed aggregated models to represent the market's preferences. This made it unsuitable for market segmentation studies. With newer hierarchical Bayesian analysis techniques, individual-level utilities may be estimated that provide greater insights into the heterogeneous preferences across individuals and market segments.

== Information collection ==
Data for conjoint analysis are most commonly gathered through a market research survey, although conjoint analysis can also be applied to a carefully designed configurator or data from an appropriately designed test market experiment. Market research rules of thumb apply with regard to statistical sample size and accuracy when designing conjoint analysis interviews.

The length of the conjoint questionnaire depends on the number of attributes to be assessed and the selected conjoint analysis method. A typical adaptive conjoint questionnaire with 20–25 attributes may take more than 30 minutes to complete. Choice based conjoint analysis, by using a smaller profile set distributed across the sample as a whole, may be completed in less than 15 minutes. Choice exercises may be displayed as a store front type layout or in some other simulated shopping environment.

== Analysis ==
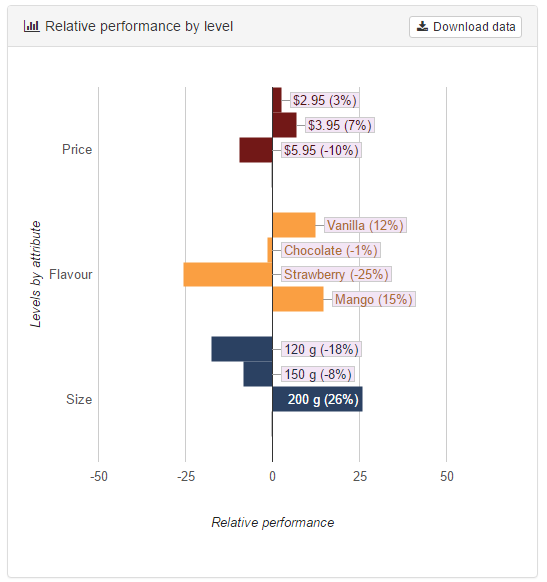
Sample output of conjoint analysis with application to marketing

Because conjoint designs are complicated, they usually generate substantial measurement error (as indicated by low intra-respondent reliability), which can induce substantial bias in any direction by any amount; this bias must be corrected in statistical analyses of conjoint data. Depending on the type of model, different econometric and statistical methods can be used to estimate utility functions. These utility functions indicate the perceived value of the feature and how sensitive consumer perceptions and preferences are to changes in product features. The actual estimation procedure will depend on the design of the task and profiles for respondents and the measurement scale used to indicate preferences (interval-scaled, ranking, or discrete choice). For estimating the utilities for each attribute level using ratings-based full profile tasks, linear regression may be appropriate, for choice based tasks, maximum likelihood estimation usually with logistic regression is typically used. The original utility estimation methods were monotonic analysis of variance or linear programming techniques, but contemporary marketing research practice has shifted towards choice-based models using multinomial logit, mixed versions of this model, and other refinements. Bayesian estimators are also very popular. Hierarchical Bayesian procedures are nowadays relatively popular as well.

== Advantages and disadvantages ==
=== Advantages ===
- estimates psychological tradeoffs that consumers make when evaluating several attributes together
- can measure preferences at the individual level
- uncovers real or hidden drivers which may not be apparent to respondents themselves
- mimics realistic choice or shopping task
- able to use physical objects
- if appropriately designed, can model interactions between attributes
- may be used to develop needs-based segmentation, when applying models that recognize respondent heterogeneity of tastes

=== Disadvantages ===
- designing conjoint studies can be complex
- when facing too many product features and product profiles, respondents often resort to simplification strategies
- difficult to use for product positioning research because there is no procedure for converting perceptions about actual features to perceptions about a reduced set of underlying features
- respondents are unable to articulate attitudes toward new categories, or may feel forced to think about issues they would otherwise not give much thought to
- poorly designed studies may over-value emotionally-laden product features and undervalue concrete features
- does not take into account the quantity of products purchased per respondent, but weighting respondents by their self-reported purchase volume or extensions such as volumetric conjoint analysis may remedy this

== Practical applications ==
=== Market research ===
One practical application of conjoint analysis in business analysis is given by the following example: A real estate developer is interested in building a high rise apartment complex near an urban Ivy League university. To ensure the success of the project, a market research firm is hired to conduct focus groups with current students. Students are segmented by academic year (freshman, upper classmen, graduate studies) and amount of financial aid received. Study participants are shown a series of choice scenarios, involving different apartment living options specified on six attributes (proximity to campus, cost, telecommunication packages, laundry options, floor plans, and security features offered). The estimated cost to construct the building associated with each apartment option is equivalent. Participants are asked to choose their preferred apartment option within each choice scenario. This forced choice exercise reveals the participants' priorities and preferences. Multinomial logistic regression may be used to estimate the utility scores for each attribute level of the six attributes involved in the conjoint experiment. Using these utility scores, market preference for any combination of the attribute levels describing potential apartment living options may be predicted.

The market research approach, Mind Genomics (MG), is an application of Conjoint Analysis (CA). CA is carried out to evaluate consumer acceptance, presenting them with a set of product attributes and assessing their preferences for different attribute combinations by estimating the utility scores for different attribute levels. MG applying CA delves deeper into the psychological and emotional aspects that influence decision-making, assisting in the initial identification of the attributes that are most salient to consumers and helping researchers refine the attributes to be used in CA.

In a private opinion survey by US-based Populace, they used a method called choice-based conjoint (CBC) analysis to understand how Americans define success. Instead of directly asking people to define success, the survey made respondents choose between different options, simulating real-life decision-making.

=== Litigation ===
Federal courts in the United States have allowed expert witnesses to use conjoint analysis to support their opinions on the damages that an infringer of a patent should pay to compensate the patent holder for violating its rights. Nonetheless, legal scholars have noted that the Federal Circuit's jurisprudence on the use of conjoint analysis in patent-damages calculations remains in a formative stage.

One example of this is how Apple used a conjoint analysis to prove the damages suffered by Samsung's copyright infringement, and increase their compensation in the case.

== See also ==
- Advertising
- Discrete choice (choice modelling)
- Marketing
- Marketing research
- New product development
- Quantitative marketing research
- TURF analysis
- Value-based pricing
