= TURF analysis =

TURF analysis, an acronym for "total unduplicated reach and frequency", is a type of statistical analysis used for providing estimates of media or market potential and devising optimal communication and placement strategies given limited resources. TURF analysis identifies the number of users reached by a communication, and how often they are reached.

Although originally used by media schedulers to maximize reach and frequency of media spending across different items (print, broadcast, etc.), TURF is also now used to provide estimates of market potential. For example, if a company plans to market a new yogurt, they may consider launching ten possible flavors, but in reality, only three might be purchased in large quantities. The TURF algorithm identifies the optimal product line to maximize the total number of consumers who will purchase at least one SKU. Typically, when TURF is undertaken for optimizing a product range, the analysis only looks at the reach of the product range (ignoring the frequency component of TURF).

In order to obtain data on the items being evaluated, ratings/choices may be obtained via quantitative marketing research (such as a survey).
