= Commons =

Concept in political economics

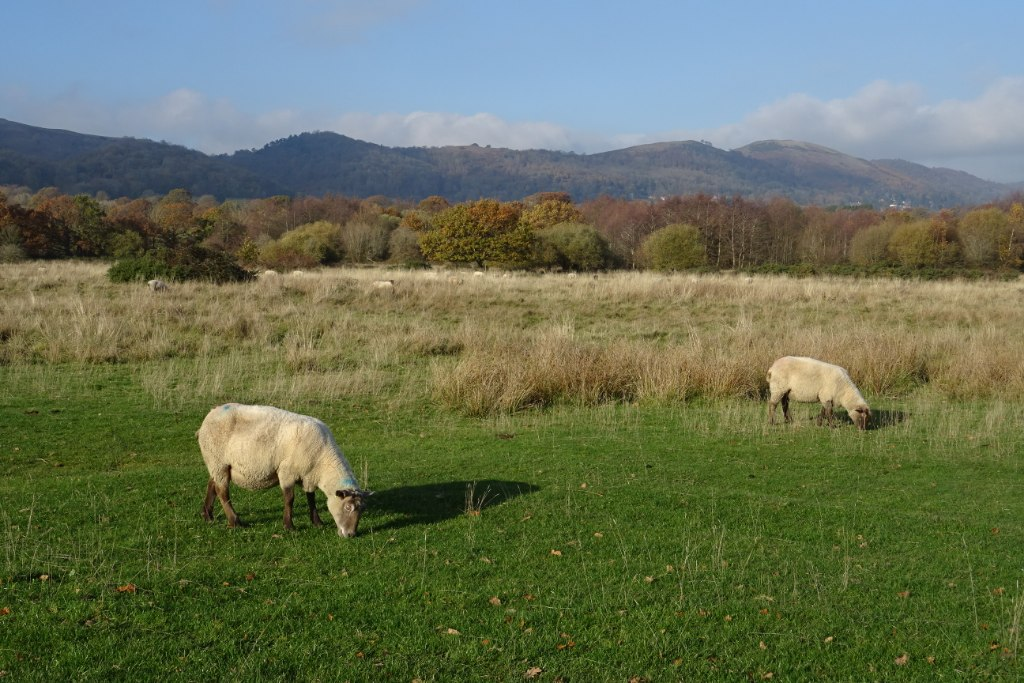
Sheep grazing on common pasture, a stereotypical environmental commons, at Castlemorton

The commons are the cultural and natural resources accessible to all members of a society, including natural materials such as air, water, and a habitable Earth. These resources are held in common even when owned privately or publicly. Commons can also be understood as natural resources that groups of people (communities, user groups) manage for individual and collective benefit. Characteristically, this involves a variety of informal norms and values (social practice) employed for a governance mechanism. Commons can also be defined as a social practice of governing a resource not by state or market but by a community of users that self-governs the resource through institutions that it creates.

== Definition and modern use ==
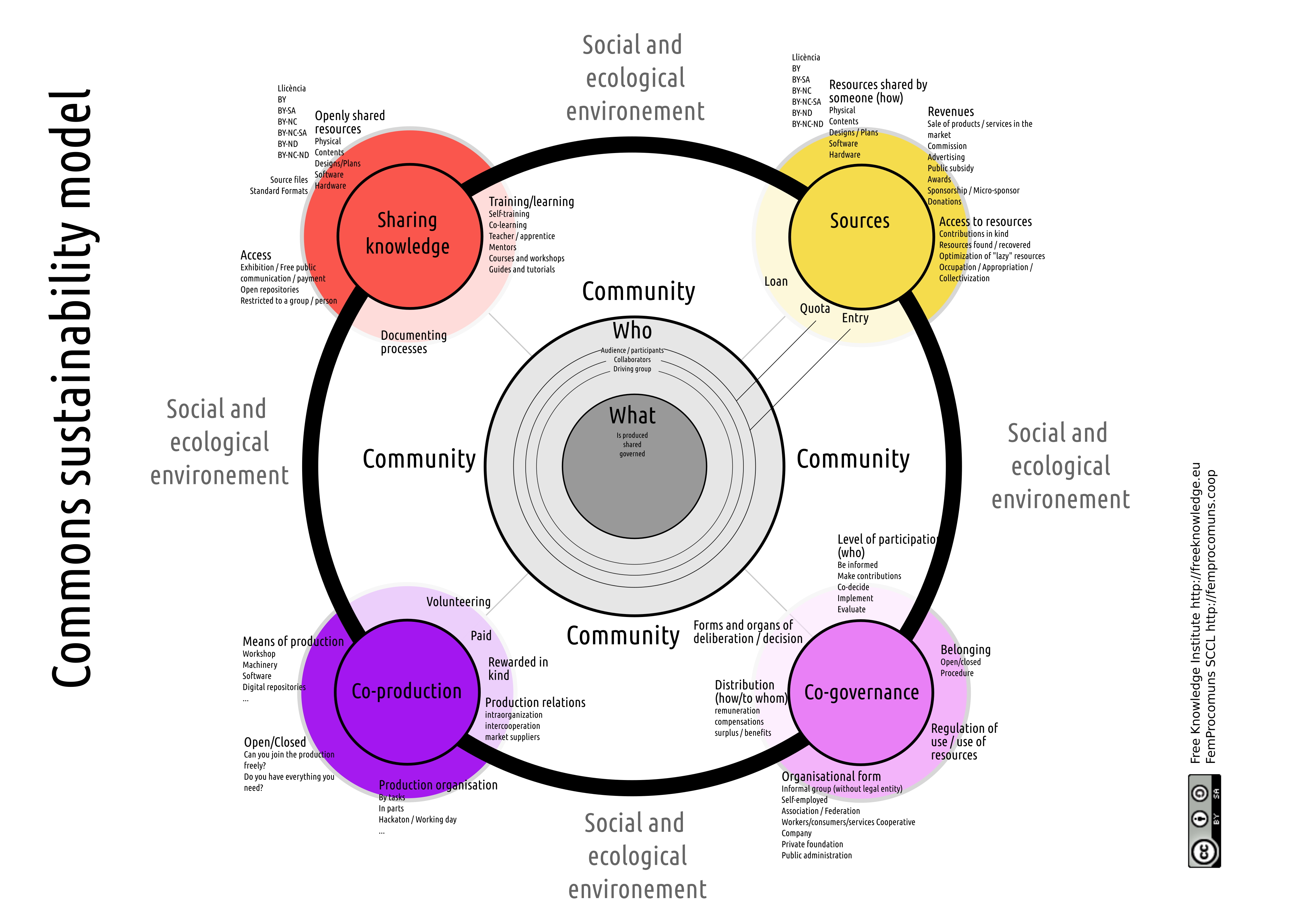
Commons sustainability model

The Digital Library of the Commons defines "commons" as "a general term for shared resources in which each stakeholder has an equal interest".

The term "commons" derives from the traditional English legal term for common land, which are also known as "commons", and was popularised in the modern sense as a shared resource term by the ecologist Garrett Hardin in an influential 1968 article called "The Tragedy of the Commons". As Frank van Laerhoven and Elinor Ostrom have stated; "Prior to the publication of Hardin's article on the tragedy of the commons (1968), titles containing the words 'the commons', 'common pool resources', or 'common property' were very rare in the academic literature."

Some texts make a distinction in usage between common ownership of the commons and collective ownership among a group of colleagues, such as in a producers' cooperative. The precision of this distinction is not always maintained. Others conflate open access areas with commons; however, open access areas can be used by anybody while the commons has a defined set of users.

The use of "commons" for natural resources has its roots in European intellectual history, where it referred to shared agricultural fields, grazing lands and forests that were, over a period of several hundred years, enclosed, claimed as private property for private use. In European political texts, the common wealth was the totality of the material riches of the world, such as the air, the water, the soil and the seed, all nature's bounty regarded as the inheritance of humanity as a whole, to be shared together. In this context, one may go back further, to the Roman legal category res communis, applied to things common to all to be used and enjoyed by everyone, as opposed to res publica, applied to public property managed by the government.

== Economic theories ==
=== Tragedy of the commons ===
A commons failure theory, now called tragedy of the commons, originated in the 18th century. In 1833 William Forster Lloyd introduced the concept by a hypothetical example of herders overusing a shared parcel of land on which they are each entitled to let their cows graze, to the detriment of all users of the common land. The same concept has been called the "tragedy of the fishers", when over-fishing could cause stocks to plummet. Forster's pamphlet was little known, and it was not until 1968, with the publication by the ecologist Garrett Hardin of the article "The Tragedy of the Commons", that the term gained relevance. Hardin introduced this tragedy as a social dilemma, and aimed at exposing the inevitability of failure that he saw in the commons.

However, Hardin's (1968) argument has been widely criticized, since he is accused of having mistaken the commons, that is, resources held and managed in common by a community, with open access, that is, resources that are open to everyone but where it is difficult to restrict access or to establish rules. In the case of the commons, the community manages and sets the rules of access and use of the resource held in common: the fact of having a commons, then, does not mean that anyone is free to use the resource as they like. Studies by Ostrom and others have shown that managing a resource as a commons often has positive outcomes and avoids the so-called tragedy of the commons, a fact that Hardin overlooked.

It has been said the dissolution of the traditional land commons played a watershed role in landscape development and cooperative land use patterns and property rights. However, as in the British Isles, such changes took place over several centuries as a result of land enclosure.

Economist Peter Barnes has proposed a 'sky trust' to fix this tragedic problem in worldwide generic commons. He claims that the sky belongs to all the people, and companies do not have a right to over pollute. It is a type of cap and dividend program. Ultimately the goal would be to make polluting excessively more expensive than cleaning what is being put into the atmosphere.

=== Successful commons ===
While the original work on the tragedy of the commons concept suggested that all commons were doomed to failure, they remain important in the modern world. Work by later economists has found many examples of successful commons, and Elinor Ostrom won the Nobel Prize for analysing situations where they operate successfully. For example, Ostrom found that grazing commons in the Swiss Alps have been run successfully for many hundreds of years by the farmers there.

Allied to this is the "comedy of the commons" concept, where users of the commons are able to develop mechanisms to police their use to maintain, and possibly improve, the state of the commons. This term was coined in an essay by legal scholar, Carol M. Rose, in 1986.

Building off of Ostrom's work, other scholars such as Baggio et al. have continued to analyze what factors support the successful management of the commons and common-pool resources. Design principles are considered a form of soft human-made infrastructure that are a pillar of successful management of the commons. In Governing the Commons, Ostrom describes the following design principles which she found are often used in cases where common-pool resources are governed successfully: Clearly defined boundaries, congruence between appropriation and provision rules and local conditions, collective-choice arrangements, monitoring, graduated sanctions, conflict resolution mechanisms, minimal recognition of rights to organize, and nested enterprises. In addition to these principles, there are many others which may support the effective management of common-pool resources. Design principles are most effective in successful common-pool resource management when more than nine are used in combination..

In middle Europe, commons were kept for relatively small-scale agriculture, especially in southern Germany, Austria, and the alpine countries, and some of these still exist. Some studies have compared the German and English dealings with the commons between late medieval times and the agrarian reforms of the 18th and 19th centuries. The UK was quite radical in doing away with and enclosing former commons, while southwestern Germany (and the alpine countries as e.g. Switzerland) had the most advanced commons structures, and were more inclined to keep them. The Lower Rhine region took an intermediate position. However, the UK and the former dominions have till today a large amount of Crown land which often is used for community or conservation purposes.

== Types ==
=== Global commons ===
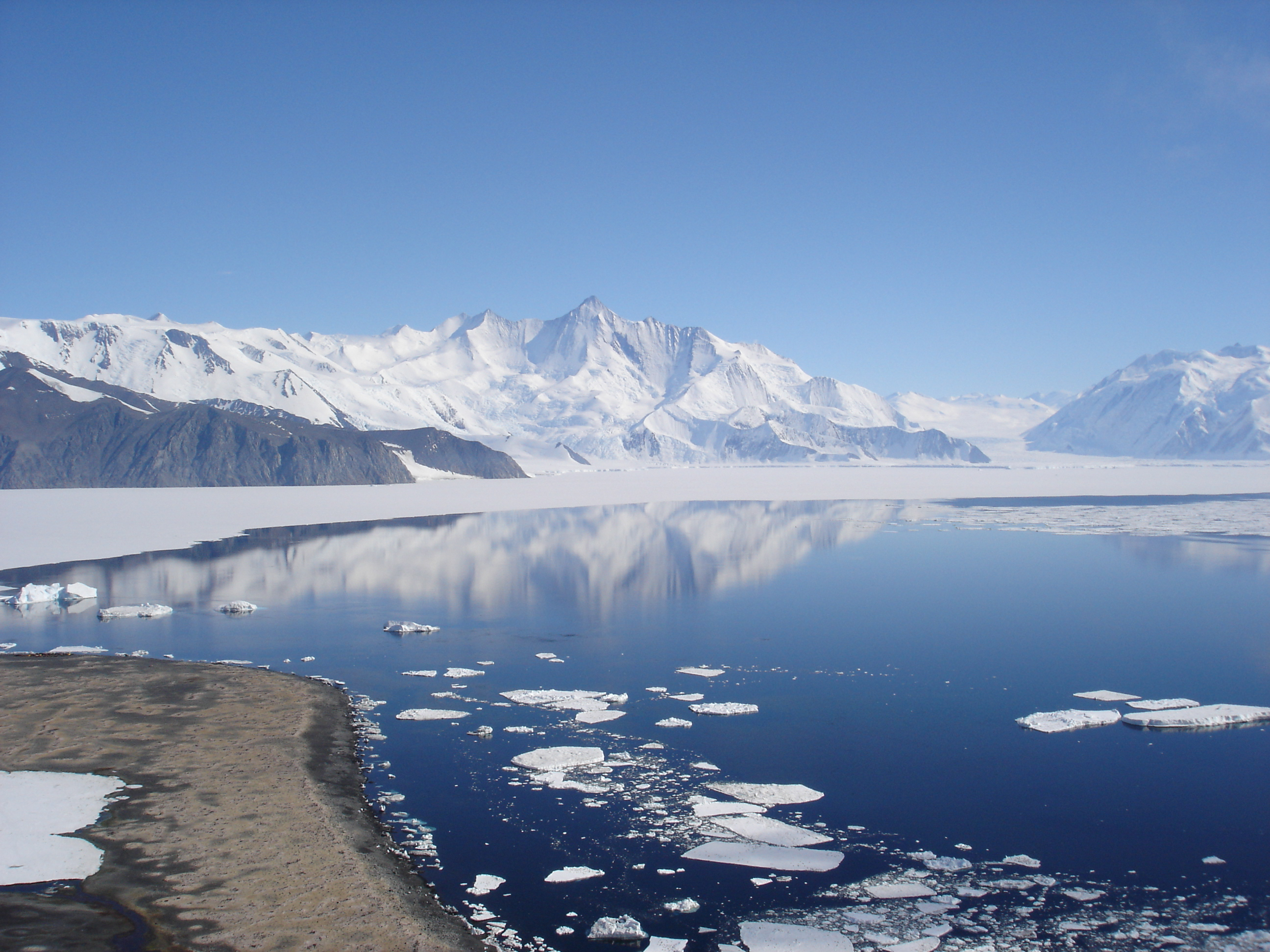
Antarctica is considered to be a global commons.

Global commons is a concept to describe international, supranational, and global resource domains in which common-pool resources are found. They are "areas that lie outside of the political reach of any one nation State". Global commons include the earth's shared natural resources, such as the high seas (international waters), the atmosphere and outer space and the Antarctic in particular. The global commons concept investigates how those shared resources that lie outside of national borders can be managed or governed.

=== Energy commons ===
The commons framework has also been applied to infrastructure. Chris Giotitsas, Vasilis Kostakis and colleagues argue that energy systems could be reconfigured as a commons rather than governed through private markets or centralised state provision, proposing a commons-oriented "Energy Internet" in which production and distribution are governed by the communities using them. Kostakis, Giotitsas and Dimitris Kitsikopoulos have since sketched what such a system might look like in practice, depicting a landscape of energy cooperatives, makerspaces and open-source enterprises across urban, suburban and rural settings, and assessing it against energy justice criteria of availability, affordability, transparency and sustainability. A systematic review of the field by Thomas Bauwens, Robert Wade and Matthew Burke found that research on energy commons has concentrated on production, distribution and use while paying less attention to upstream extraction and downstream waste, and identified a recurring tension between treating the commons as an alternative to capitalism and acknowledging their co-optation by it.

=== Cultural and intellectual commons ===
Today, the commons are also understood within a cultural sphere. These commons include literature, music, arts, design, film, video, television, radio, information, software and sites of heritage. Wikipedia is an example of the production and maintenance of common goods by a contributor community in the form of encyclopedic knowledge that can be freely accessed by anyone without a central authority.

The information commons may help protect users of commons. Companies that pollute the environment release information about what they are doing. The Corporate Toxics Information Project and information like the Toxic 100, a list of the top 100 polluters, helps people know what these corporations are doing to the environment.

==== Digital commons ====
Mayo Fuster Morell proposed a definition of digital commons as "information and knowledge resources that are collectively created and owned or shared between or among a community and that tend to be non-exclusive, that is, be (generally freely) available to third parties. Thus, they are oriented to favor use and reuse, rather than to exchange as a commodity. Additionally, the community of people building them can intervene in the governing of their interaction processes and of their shared resources."

Examples of digital commons are Wikipedia, free software and open-source hardware projects.

Pranay Khattar and Vasilis Kostakis argue that large-scale AI scraping strains the reciprocity underpinning digital commons: contributions are absorbed into proprietary models with no value returning to the commons, and contributors have no means to permit public use while refusing commercial use. They characterise this as a form of enclosure and propose treating high-volume commercial AI access as a privileged activity subject to a "commons levy".

Following the narrative of post-growth, the digital commons can present a model of progress that guide commoners to build counter-power in the economic and political field. Being able to digitally share knowledge and resources through internet platforms is a new capacity that challenges the traditional hierarchical structures of production, allowing for a higher collective benefit and a sustainable management of resources. Non-material resources are digitally reproducible and therefore can be shared at a low cost, contrary to physical resources which are quite limited. Shared resources represent in this context data, information, culture and knowledge which are produced and accessible online. In accordance with the "design global, manufacture local" approach digital commons may link the traditional commons theory with existing physical infrastructures. It further connects with the degrowth communities since transformations in use-value creation by employing new technologies, decoupling society from GDP growth and lower carbon dioxide emissions, are envisioned. Moreover, as a decentralized approach, there is a strong emphasis on inclusion and democratic regulation which has led Commons as an alternative, emancipatory and emerging form of social organization that goes beyond democratic capitalism. Accordingly, through the cooperation of diverse stakeholders and the equitable distribution of means of production, technological development becomes more accessible and bottom-up projects are fostered in communities.

=== Urban commons ===
Urban commons present the opportunity for the citizens to gain power upon the management of the urban resources and reframe city-life costs based on their use value and maintenance costs, rather than the market-driven value.

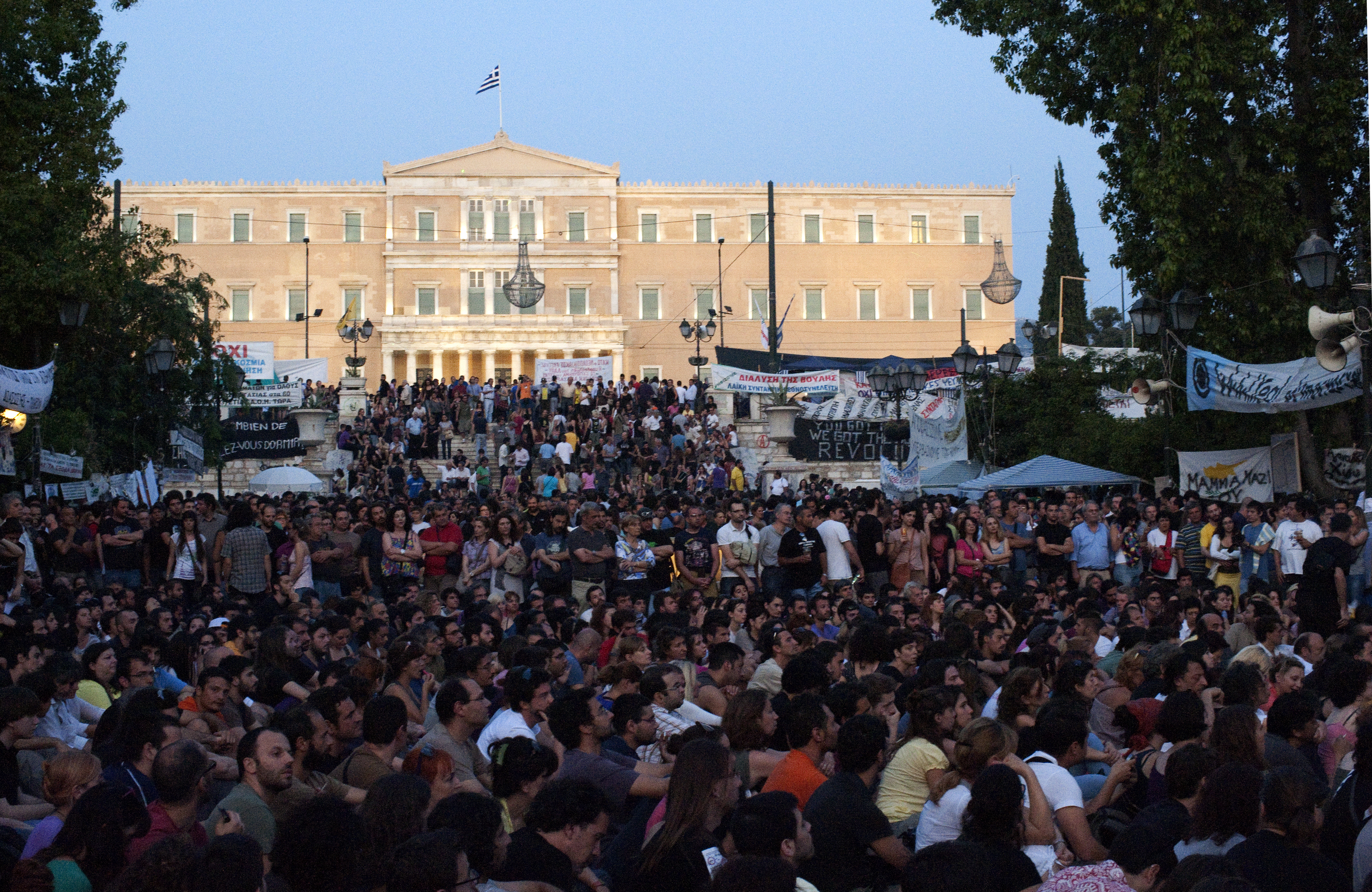
Syntagma Square in Athens as urban commons

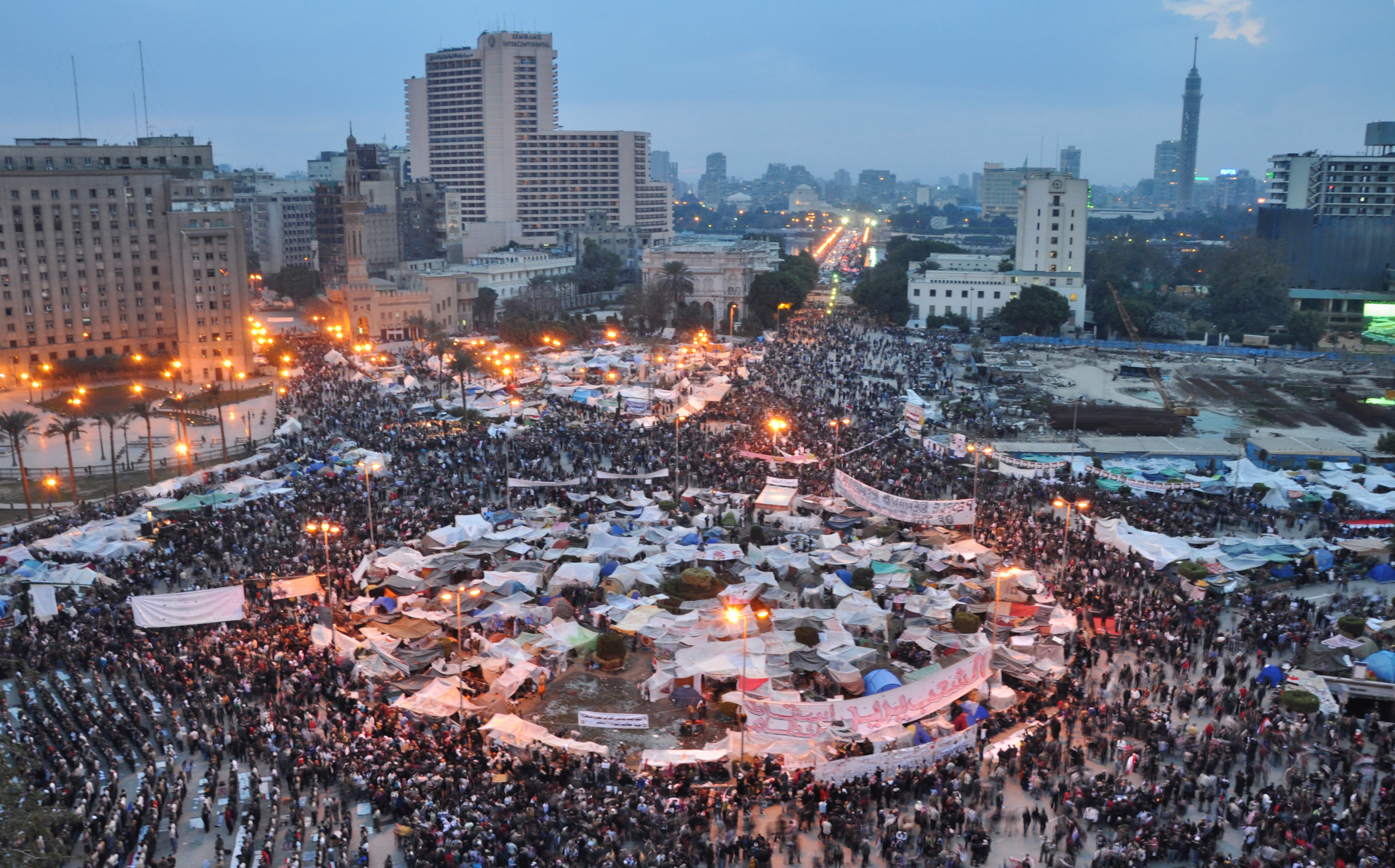
Tahrir Square in Cairo as urban commons

Urban commons situates citizens as key players rather than public authorities, private markets and technologies. David Harvey (2012) defines the distinction between public spaces and urban commons. He highlights that the former is not to be equated automatically with urban commons. Public spaces and goods in the city make a commons when part of the citizens take political action. Syntagma Square in Athens, Tahrir Square in Cairo, Maidan Nezalezhnosti in Kyiv, and the Plaza de Catalunya in Barcelona were public spaces that transformed to an urban commons as people protested there to support their political statements. Streets are public spaces that have often become an urban commons by social action and revolutionary protests. Urban commons are operating in the cities in a complementary way with the state and the market. Some examples are community gardening, urban farms on the rooftops and cultural spaces. Participatory studies of commons and infrastructures under the conditions of the 2008 financial crisis have emerged.

One emerging strategy of urban commons creation is the Public-Commons Partnership. This is an institutional arrangement formed between government bodies and social movements as a non-reformist reform alternative to public–private partnerships. Rather than privatizing state assets or services, this approach instead creates a joint enterprise between the state, a Commons Association, and the workers, to manage the asset democratically between the workers, the local stakeholders, and the state. Any profits gained from this type of enterprise is then reinvested in new commons institutions in the locality, and as such expands the urban commons as a whole. Barcelona is at the forefront of this approach through the Citizen Assets Programme set up during the Barcelona en Comú government in 2016, as well as successful pre-existing examples such as Can Batlló. In London, Wards Corner is a prominent example of a public-common partnership between Transport for London (public asset owner), Haringey Council, and the Wards Corner Community Benefit Society (BenCom).

=== Agricultural and land commons ===
In terms of land and agriculture, the commons refers to land and associated resources that are used collectively. The collective management and stewardship of shared land resources, known as commoning, plays an important part in the agriculture and food systems of many communities globally. Contemporary commoning practices aim to both reclaim lands that were taken away in the past through colonial, imperial, and capitalist processes and also challenge industrial agriculture's logic of enforcing strict land boundaries and erecting fenced-off parcels. These can include traditional systems such as shared agricultural commons and collectively managed forests as well as newer institutional structures such as community land trusts and seed banking. By restoring collective decision-making and tenure security around food production, commoning supports food sovereignty and environmental stewardship and helps addressing the racial and colonial legacies in modern property law and agricultural governance. In this sense, commoning forms a part of the broader movements for land justice, decolonization, and food system transformation.

== Society and culture ==
=== Feminist perspectives ===
Silvia Federici articulates a feminist perspective of the commons in her essay "Feminism and the Politics of the Commons". Since the language around the commons has been largely appropriated by the World Bank as it sought to re-brand itself "the environmental guardian of the planet", she argues that it is important to adopt a commons discourse that actively resists this re-branding. Secondly, articulations of the commons, although historically present and multiple have struggled to come together as a unified front. For the latter to happen she argues that a "commoning" or "commons" movement that is effectively able to resist capitalist forms of organizing labour and our livelihoods must look to women to take the lead in organizing the collectivization of our daily lives and the means of production.

Women have traditionally been at the forefront of struggles for commoning "as primary subjects of reproductive work". This proximity and dependence on communal natural resources has made women the most vulnerable by their privatization, and made them their most staunch defendants. Examples include: subsistence agriculture, credit associations such as tontine (money commons) and collectivizing reproductive labor.

=== Commoning as a process ===
Scholars such as David Harvey have adopted the term commoning, which as a verb serves to emphasize an understanding of the commons as a process and a practice rather than as "a particular kind of thing" or static entity. Some authors distinguish between the resources shared (the common-pool resources), the community who governs it, and commoning, that is, the process of coming together to manage such resources. Commoning thus adds another dimension to the commons, acknowledging the social practices entailed in the process of establishing and governing a commons. These practices entail, for the community of commoners, the creation of a new way of living and acting together, thus involving a collective psychological shift: it also entails a process of subjectivization, where the commoners produce themselves as common subjects.

Alex Pazaitis, Vasilis Kostakis and Wolfgang Drechsler extend commoning to the concept of value itself, treating value not as a property of exchanged things but as a collective agreement about which actions matter — and therefore as part of the shared rules and norms a community governs. They contrast capitalist value practices with commons-based ones, substituting contribution for abstract labour and provisioning for maximisation.

=== Pressures for commons in the modern world ===
Dietz, Ostrom, and Stern describe how the community management of commons face novel pressures as a result of globalization. Environmental challenges are not as localized as they once were, resources such as fish and timbre are traded on global markets, and there are climate and environmental implications which are displaced from their source. Thus, environmental impacts are more difficult to monitor and incentives for economic benefits may not be in line with the reality of the local ecosystem. Globalized markets have also brought globalized institutions which impact the ability of local communities (either positively or negatively) to make decisions over common-pool resources and commons.

=== Contemporary commons movements ===
- Abahlali baseMjondolo in South Africa
- The Bhumi Uchhed Pratirodh Committee in India
- Electronic Frontier Foundation
- The EZLN in Mexico
- Fanmi Lavalas in Haiti
- Geolibertarianism primarily in the US
- The Homeless Workers' Movement in Brazil
- The Land is Ours in the UK
- The Landless Workers' Movement in Brazil
- Movement for Justice en el Barrio in the United States of America
- Narmada Bachao Andolan in India
- Take Back the Land in the US
- Cosmopolitan localism or cosmolocalism

=== Notable theorists ===
- Peter Barnes
- Michel Bauwens
- Yochai Benkler
- David Bollier
- Murray Bookchin
- Iain Boal
- George Caffentzis
- Barry Commoner
- Silvia Federici
- Henry George
- Garrett Hardin
- Michael Hardt
- David Harvey
- Silke Helfrich
- Lewis Hyde
- Lawrence Lessig
- Peter Linebaugh
- Karl Linn
- William Forster Lloyd
- William Morris
- Fred Moten
- Antonio Negri
- Elinor Ostrom
- Raj Patel
- John Platt (see Social trap)
- Joachim Radkau
- Kenneth Rexroth
- Derek Wall
- Gerrard Winstanley

== Examples ==
=== Mongolian grasslands ===
Based on a research project by the Environmental and Cultural Conservation in Inner Asia (ECCIA) from 1992 to 1995, satellite images were used to compare the amount of land degradation due to livestock grazing in the regions of Mongolia, Russia, and China. In Mongolia, where shepherds were permitted to move collectively between seasonal grazing pastures, degradation remained relatively low at approximately 9%. Comparatively, Russia and China, which mandated state-owned pastures involving immobile settlements and in some cases privatization by household, had much higher degradation, at around 75% and 33% respectively. A collaborative effort on the part of Mongolians proved much more efficient in preserving grazing land.

=== Lobster fishery of Maine, United States ===
The widespread success of the Maine lobster industry is often attributed to the willingness of Maine's lobstermen to uphold and support lobster conservation rules. These rules include harbor territories not recognized by the state, informal trap limits, and laws imposed by the state of Maine (which are largely influenced by lobbying from lobster industry itself). The case of Maine lobster fisheries reflects how a group was able to restrain access to a resource from outsiders, while regulating the communal use in an effective manner. This has allowed the local communities to reap the benefits of the rewards of their restrain for decades. Essentially, the local lobster fishers collaborate without much government intervention to sustain their common-pool resource.

=== Irrigation systems of New Mexico, United States ===
Acequia is a method of collective responsibility and management for irrigation systems in desert areas. In New Mexico, a community-run organization known as Acequia Associations supervises water in terms of diversion, distribution, utilization, and recycling, in order to reinforce agricultural traditions and preserve water as a common resource for future generations. The Congreso de las Acequias has since 1990s, is a statewide federation that represents several hundred acequia systems in New Mexico.

=== Community forests in Nepal ===
In Nepal, the idea of community management of different resources (water, forest, pasture, etc.) has been present since the Lichchhavi period (400 to 750 CE). Community forestry started in the 70s because, first, Nepali society already had a long tradition of managing forest resources (which had been restricted by the Rana regime until 1951 to increase agricultural revenue), and second, the growing concern of degradation of environmental resources in 70s (characterized by Erik Echkholm's research that unprecedented rates of land degradation in Nepal's hills was causing massive upstream soil loss and downstream flooding and siltation) and the broader shift in international development discourses from pro-industrial modernist discourses towards small-scale and decentralized approaches.

In the late 1980s, Nepal chose to decentralize government control over forests. Community forest programs work by giving local areas a financial stake in nearby woodlands, and thereby increasing the incentive to protect them from overuse. Local institutions regulate harvesting and selling of timber and land, and must use any profit towards community development and preservation of the forests. In twenty years, some locals, especially in the middle hills, have noticed a visible increase in the number of trees, although other places have not seen tangible results, especially where opportunity costs to land are high. Community forestry may also contribute to community development in rural areas – for instance school construction, irrigation and drinking water channel construction, and road construction. Community forestry has proven conducive to democratic practices at grass roots level.

Many Nepalese forest user groups generate income from the community forests, although the amount can vary widely among groups and is often invested in the community rather than flowing directly to individual households. Such income is generated from external sources involving the sales of timber from thinned pine plantations such as in the community forest user groups of Sindhu Palchok and Rachma, and internally in Nepal's mid-hills' broad leaf forests from membership fees, penalties and fines on rule-breakers, in addition to the sales of forest products. Some of the most significant benefits are that locals are able to use the products they gather directly in their own homes for subsistence use.

=== Beaver hunting in James Bay, Quebec, Canada ===
Hunting wildlife territories in James Bay, Quebec; located in the northeastern part of Canada, provide an example of resources being effectively shared by a community. There is an extensive heritage of local customaries that are used to effectively regulate beaver hunting in the region.

=== Allotment gardens in Stockholm ===
In the Stockholm region, green spaces are predominantly owned and managed in either private or municipal forms, allotment gardens being the most common form. The system provide cultural ecosystem services to lot holders, as well as the offer of vegetables, fruits, and ornamental flowers. The majority of allotment land in Stockholm is owned by the local municipality, and leaseholds are set for extended periods of time (up to 25 years). The local allotment association makes the decisions about who gets land rights. Only residents of multifamily homes inside the municipality were permitted to sign contracts, signifying a commitment to the original goals of allotments, which were to enhance the health of city dwellers in outdoor settings. Land is organised and managed cooperatively; outside enterprises are not involved in any way.

=== Irrigation system of Valencia, Spain ===
L'Horta de València is a historic irrigated agricultural landscape surrounding the city of Valencia, Spain, characterized by long-standing institutions of collective resource management. Since the medieval period, farmers have shared and governed access to irrigation water through a network of acequias (canals) supplied by the Turia River. Water distribution, maintenance responsibilities, and dispute resolution are organized through autonomous yet highly interdependent irrigation communities, with conflicts adjudicated by the Tribunal de les Aigües de València (Water Tribunal of Valencia), an institution recognized by UNESCO as Intangible Cultural Heritage of Humanity. The system has been discussed in relation to common-pool resource governance, illustrating how locally developed rules, participatory decision-making, and collective monitoring can support long-term shared use of water resources. The irrigation system also supports a mosaic of fruit and vegetable cultivation in this dry and densely populated coastal region.

=== Can Batlló Community Space in Barcelona, Spain ===
Can Batlló is an example of an urban commons space which is self-managed by the neighbours of the community. Located on the grounds of an old textile factory, the community fought for the space to become an urban commons that benefits the people of the neighbourhood. Completed in 2016, the space is now home to 42 projects including: cooperatives benefiting social and environmental causes, recreation and arts activities, collective printing press, a children's playground, cooperative school, and restaurant focused on proximity. They operate through horizontal decision-making and aim to create a space that is a model of equity, non-discrimination, and mutual aid. This commons is an example of a community forging supportive relationships with local governments that support their interests and ability to effectively self-manage a commons for collective good.

== See also ==
- Citizen's dividend
- Common good
- Common land
- Common ownership
- Creative Commons
- The Goose and the Common
- International Association for the Study of the Commons
- Knowledge commons
- Municipalization
- Nationalization
- Public good (economics)
- Public land
- Social ownership
- State ownership
- Tragedy of the anticommons
- Tyranny of small decisions
