= Tragedy of the commons =

Overuse of a shared resource

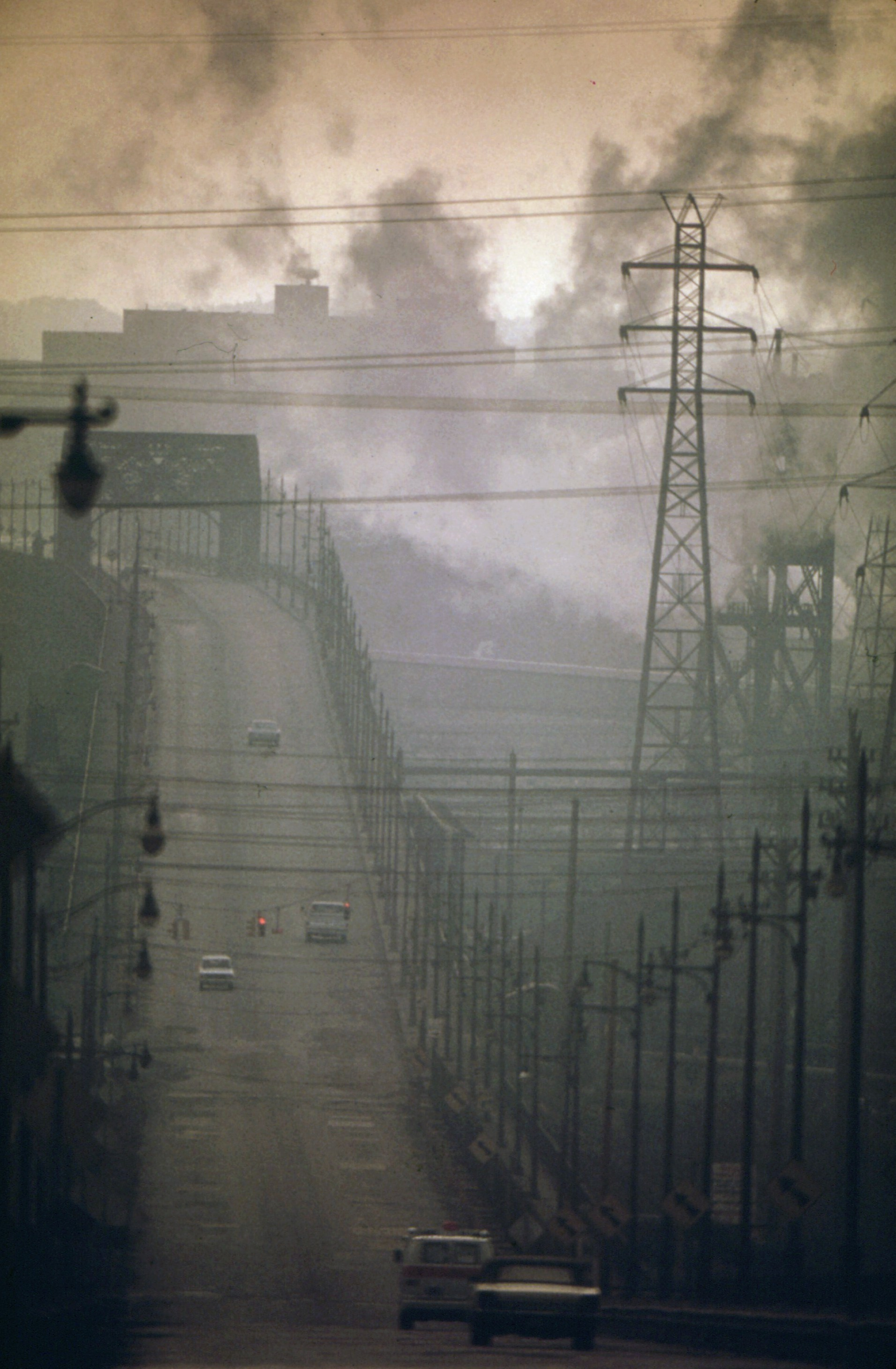
Industrial pollution is one of the consequences of operators ignoring their effect on the shared environment.

The tragedy of the commons is the idea that when a resource is shared and can benefit the individual at a cost to the community, it is rational for the individual to overuse the resource, even though this collectively leads to the depletion of the resource for everyone. The concept has been widely discussed and criticized in economics, ecology, and other sciences.

The metaphorical term is the title of a 1968 essay by ecologist, microbiologist and ethno-nationalist Garrett Hardin. Versions of this concept extend back to classical antiquity, being discussed by Aristotle. The principal concern of Hardin's essay was overpopulation of the planet. To prevent the inevitable tragedy (he argued) it was necessary to reject the principle (supposedly enshrined in the Universal Declaration of Human Rights) according to which every family has a right to choose the number of its offspring, and to replace it by "mutual coercion, mutually agreed upon". On the same grounds, Hardin argued that rich countries should adopt lifeboat ethics ending aid to the poor and stopping migration from poor countries.

Some scholars have argued that over-exploitation of the common resource is by no means inevitable, since the individuals concerned may be able to achieve mutual restraint by consensus. Others have contended that the metaphor of a common pasture is inapposite or inaccurate because its exemplar – unfettered access to common land – did not exist historically, the right to exploit common land being controlled by law. The work of Elinor Ostrom, who received the Nobel Prize in Economics, is seen by some economists as having refuted Hardin's claims. Hardin's views on over-population have been criticised as simplistic, eugenicist, and racist.

== Expositions ==
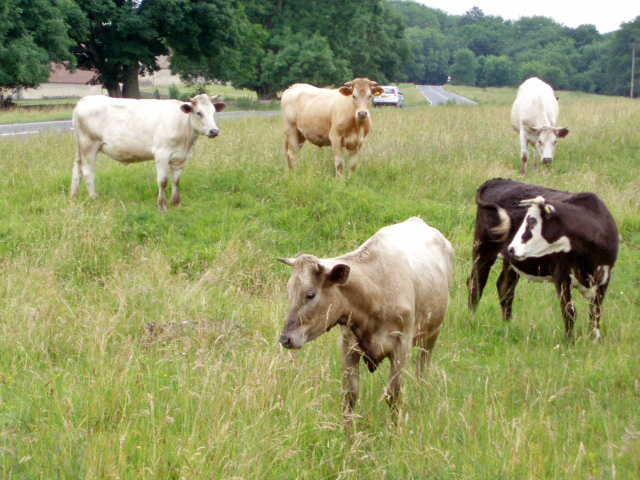
Cows on Selsley Common, England. Lloyd used shared grazing of common land as an illustration of where abuse of rights could occur.

=== Classical ===
The concept of unrestricted-access resources becoming spent, where personal use does not incur personal expense, was discussed by the philosopher Aristotle, who observed in his Politics that

"That which is common to the greatest number has the least care bestowed upon it. Every one thinks chiefly of his own, hardly at all of the common interest; and only when he is himself concerned as an individual."

=== Lloyd's pamphlet ===
In 1833, the English economist William Forster Lloyd published "Two Lectures on the Checks to Population", a pamphlet that included a hypothetical example of over-use of a common resource. This was the situation of cattle herders sharing a common parcel of land on which they were each entitled to let their cows graze.

He postulated that if a herder put more than his allotted number of cattle on the common, overgrazing could result. For each additional animal, a herder could receive additional benefits, while the whole group shared the resulting damage to the commons. If all herders made this individually rational economic decision, the common could be depleted or even destroyed, to the detriment of all.

Lloyd's pamphlet was written after the enclosure movement had eliminated the open field system of common property as the standard model for land exploitation in England (though there remained, and still remain, millions of acres of "common land": see § Commons in historical reality). Carl Dahlman and others have asserted that his description was historically inaccurate, pointing to the fact that the system endured for hundreds of years without producing the disastrous effects claimed by Lloyd.

=== Garrett Hardin's article ===
In 1968, ecologist Garrett Hardin explored this social dilemma in his article "The Tragedy of the Commons", published in the journal Science. The essay derived its title from the pamphlet by Lloyd, which he cites, on the over-grazing of common land.

Therein is the tragedy. Each man is locked into a system that compels him to increase his herd without limit – in a world that is limited. Ruin is the destination toward which all men rush, each pursuing his own best interest in a society that believes in the freedom of the commons. Freedom in a commons brings ruin to all.

— Garrett Hardin, The Tragedy of the Commons

Hardin discussed problems that cannot be solved by technical means, as distinct from those with solutions that require "a change only in the techniques of the natural sciences, demanding little or nothing in the way of change in human values or ideas of morality". Hardin focused on human population growth, the use of the Earth's natural resources, and the welfare state.

Hardin argued that if individuals relied on themselves alone, and not on the relationship between society and man, then people would treat other people as resources, which would lead to the world population growing and for the process to continue. Parents breeding excessively would leave fewer descendants because they would be unable to provide for each child adequately. Such negative feedback is found in the animal kingdom. Hardin said that if the children of improvident parents starved to death, if overbreeding was its own punishment, then there would be no public interest in controlling the breeding of families.

==== Political inferences ====
Hardin blamed the welfare state for allowing the tragedy of the commons; where the state provides for children and supports overbreeding as a fundamental human right, a Malthusian catastrophe is inevitable. Consequently, in his article, Hardin lamented the following proposal from the United Nations:

The Universal Declaration of Human Rights describes the family as the natural and fundamental unit of society. [Article 16] It follows that any choice and decision with regard to the size of the family must irrevocably rest with the family itself, and cannot be made by anyone else.

— U Thant, Statement on Population by the Secretary-General of the United Nations

In addition, Hardin also pointed out the problem of individuals acting in rational self-interest by claiming that if all members in a group used common resources for their own gain and with no regard for others, all resources would still eventually be depleted. Overall, Hardin argued against relying on conscience as a means of policing commons, suggesting that this favors selfish individuals – often known as free riders – over those who are more altruistic.

In the context of avoiding over-exploitation of common-pool resources, Hardin concluded by restating Hegel's maxim (quoted by Engels), "freedom is the recognition of necessity". He suggested that "freedom" completes the tragedy of the commons. By recognizing resources as commons in the first place, and by recognizing that, as such, they require management, Hardin believed that humans "can preserve and nurture other and more precious freedoms".

=== The "Commons" as a modern resource concept ===
Hardin's article marked the mainstream acceptance of the term "commons" as used to connote a shared resource. As Frank van Laerhoven and Elinor Ostrom have stated: "Prior to the publication of Hardin's article on the tragedy of the commons (1968), titles containing the words 'the commons', 'common pool resources', or 'common property' were very rare in the academic literature." They go on to say: "In 2002, Barrett and Mabry conducted a major survey of biologists to determine which publications in the twentieth century had become classic books or benchmark publications in biology. They report that Hardin's 1968 article was the one having the greatest career impact on biologists and is the most frequently cited". However, the Ostroms point out that Hardin's analysis was based on crucial misconceptions about the nature of common property systems.

=== System archetype ===
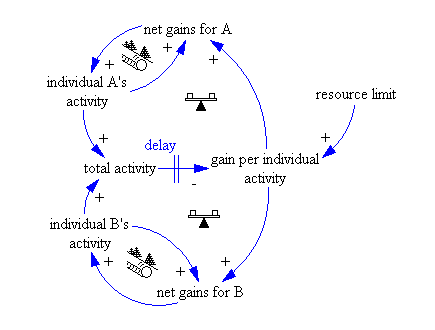
Causal loop diagram of the "tragedy of the commons"

In systems theory, the commons problem is one of the ten most common system archetypes. The Tragedy of the Commons archetype can be illustrated using a causal loop diagram.

== Application ==
=== Metaphoric meaning ===
Like Lloyd and Thomas Malthus before him, Hardin was primarily interested in the problem of human population growth. But in his essay, he also focused on the use of larger (though finite) resources such as the Earth's atmosphere and oceans, as well as pointing out the "negative commons" of pollution (i.e., instead of dealing with the deliberate privatization of a positive resource, a "negative commons" deals with the deliberate commonization of a negative cost, pollution).

As a metaphor, the tragedy of the commons should not be taken too literally. The "tragedy" is not in the word's conventional or theatric sense, nor a condemnation of the processes that lead to it. Similarly, Hardin's use of "commons" has frequently been misunderstood, leading him to later remark that he should have titled his work "The Tragedy of the Unregulated Commons".

The metaphor illustrates the argument that free access and unrestricted demand for a finite resource ultimately reduces the resource through over-exploitation, temporarily or permanently. This occurs because the benefits of exploitation accrue to individuals or groups, each of whom is motivated to maximise the use of the resource to the point in which they become reliant on it, while the costs of the exploitation are borne by all those to whom the resource is available (which may be a wider class of individuals than those who are exploiting it). This, in turn, causes demand for the resource to increase, which causes the problem to snowball until the resource collapses (even if it retains a capacity to recover). The rate at which depletion of the resource is realised depends primarily on three factors: the number of users wanting to consume the common in question, the consumptive nature of their uses, and the relative robustness of the common.

The same concept is sometimes called the "tragedy of the fishers", because fishing too many fish before or during breeding could cause stocks to plummet.

=== Modern commons ===
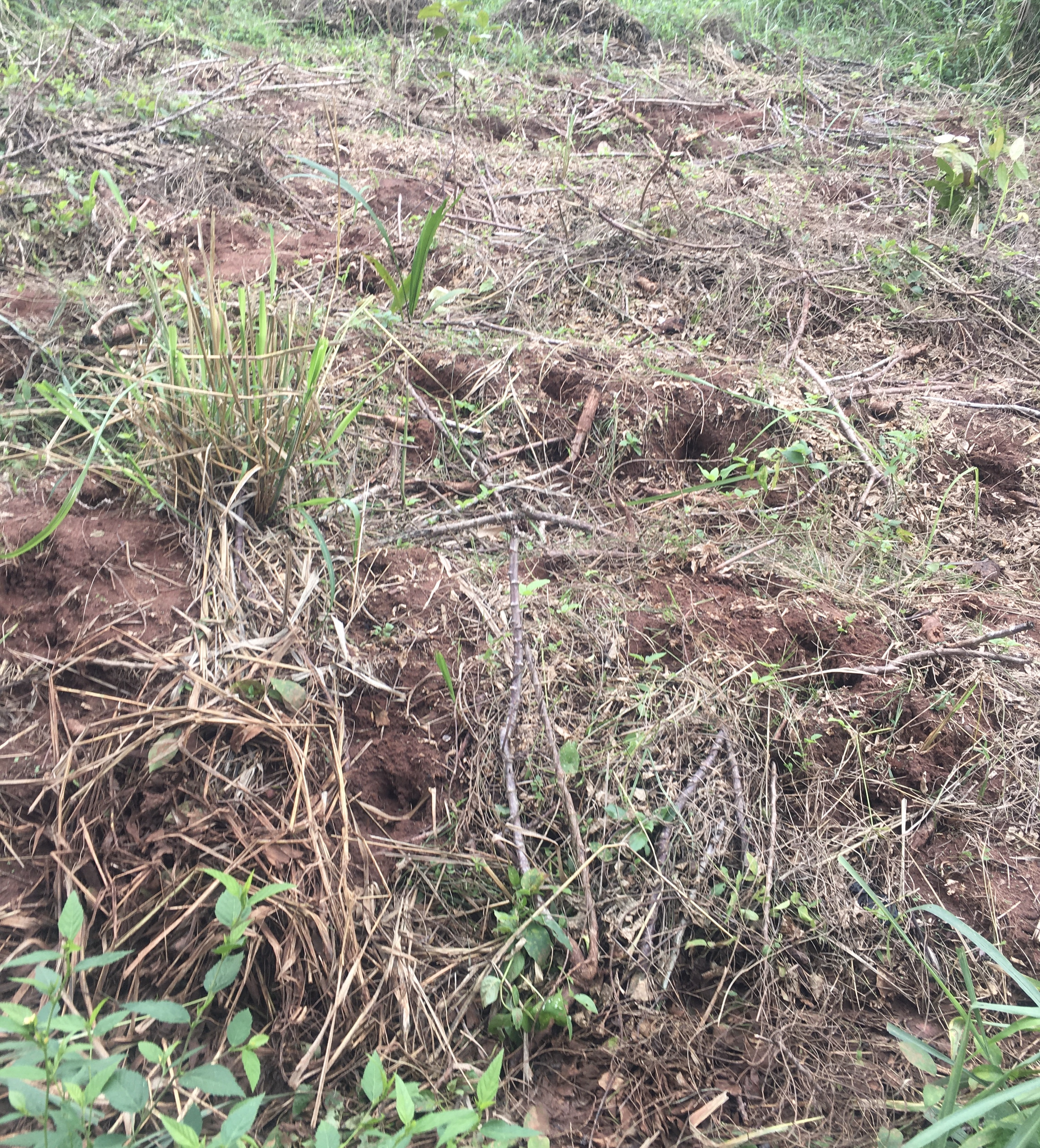
Effect of over grazing

The tragedy of the commons can be considered in relation to environmental issues such as sustainability. The commons dilemma stands as a model for a great variety of resource problems in society today, such as water, forests, fish, and non-renewable energy sources such as oil, gas, and coal.

Hardin's model posits that the tragedy of the commons may emerge if individuals prioritise self-interest.

Another case study involves beavers in Canada, historically crucial for natives who, as stewards, organised to hunt them for food and commerce. Non-native trappers, motivated by fur prices, contributed to resource degradation, wresting control from the indigenous population. Conservation laws enacted in the 1930s in response to declining beaver populations led to the expulsion of trappers, legal acknowledgment of natives, and enforcement of customary laws. This intervention resulted in productive harvests by the 1950s.

Situations exemplifying the "tragedy of the commons" include the overfishing and destruction of the Grand Banks of Newfoundland, the destruction of salmon runs on rivers that have been dammed (most prominently in modern times on the Columbia River in the Northwest United States and historically in North Atlantic rivers), and the devastation of the sturgeon fishery (in modern Russia, but historically in the United States as well). In terms of water supply, another example is the limited water available in arid regions (e.g., the area of the Aral Sea and the Los Angeles water system supply (especially at Mono Lake and Owens Lake) and in the Konya basin in Turkey).

In economics, an externality is a cost or benefit that affects a party who did not choose to incur that cost or benefit. Negative externalities are a well-known feature of the "tragedy of the commons". For example, driving cars has many negative externalities; these include pollution, carbon emissions, and traffic accidents. Every time Person A gets in a car, it becomes more likely for Person Z to suffer in each of those areas. Economists often urge the government to adopt policies that "internalize" an externality.

The tragedy of the commons can also refer to the idea of open data. Anonymised data are crucial for useful social research and represent therefore a public resource – better said, a common good – that is liable to exhaustion. Some feel that the law should provide a safe haven for the dissemination of research data, since it can be argued that current data protection policies overburden valuable research without mitigating realistic risks.

An expansive application of the concept can also be seen in Stuart Vyse's analysis of differences between countries in their responses to the COVID-19 pandemic. In 2015, Vyse argued that those who defy public health recommendations can be thought of as spoiling a set of common goods, "the economy, the healthcare system, and the very air we breathe, for all of us. In a similar vein, it has been argued that higher sickness and mortality rates from COVID-19 in individualistic cultures with less obligatory collectivism, is another instance of the "tragedy of the commons".

== Examples ==
General examples (some alluded to by Hardin) of potential and actual tragedies include:

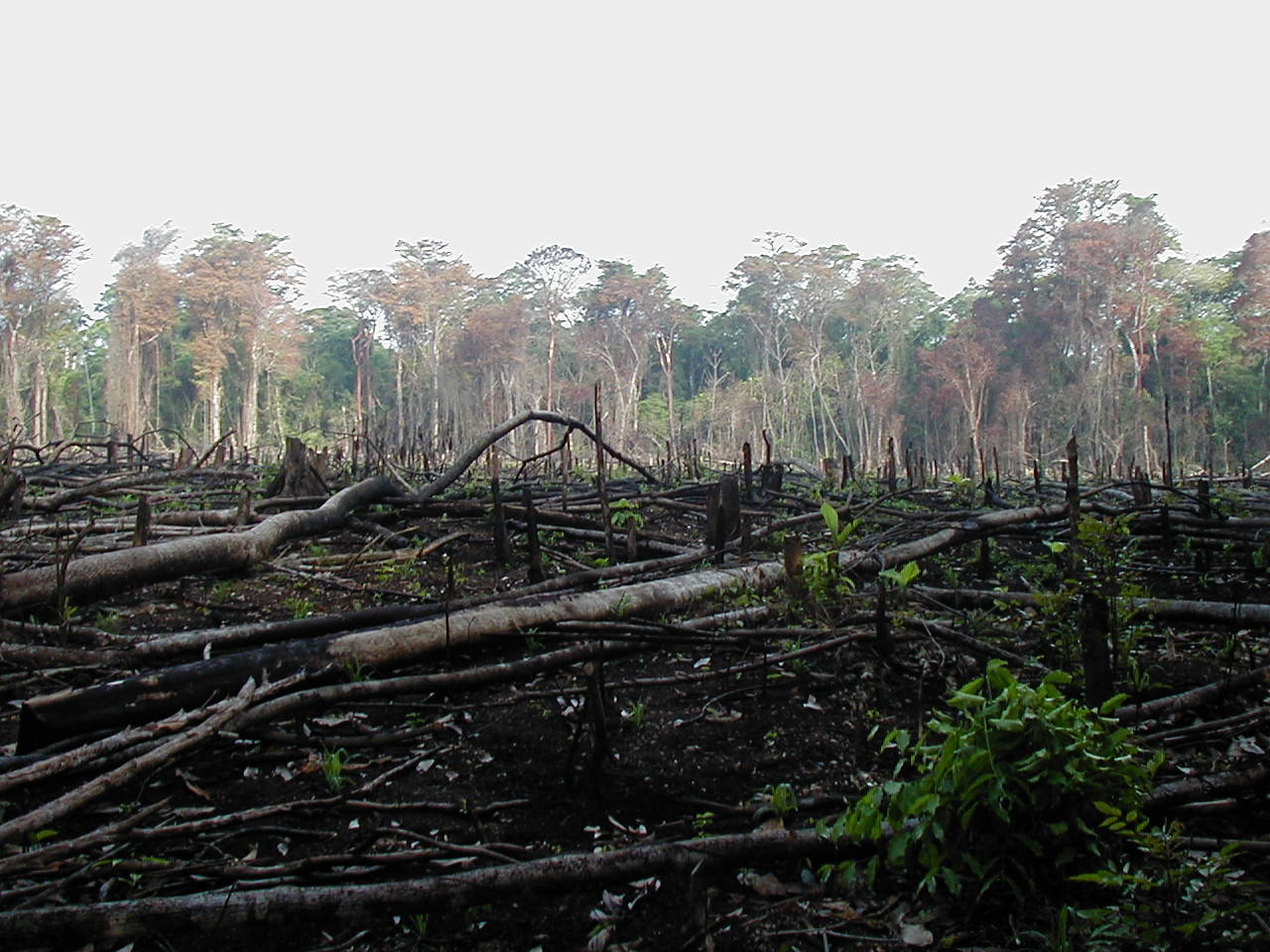
Clearing rainforest for agriculture in southern Mexico

=== Physical resources ===
- Uncontrolled human population growth leading to overpopulation.
- Atmosphere: through the release of pollution that leads to ozone depletion, global warming, ocean acidification (by way of increased atmospheric CO_{2} being absorbed by the sea), and particulate pollution.
- Light pollution: with the loss of the night sky for research and cultural significance, affected human, flora and fauna health, nuisance, trespass and the loss of enjoyment or function of private property.
- Water: Water pollution, water crisis of over-extraction of groundwater and wasting water due to overirrigation.
- Forests: Frontier logging of old growth forest and slash and burn.
- Energy resources and climate: Environmental residue of mining and drilling, burning of fossil fuels, and consequential global warming.
- Animals: Habitat destruction and poaching leading to the Holocene mass extinction.
- Oceans: Overfishing
- Space debris in Earth's surrounding space leading to limited locations for new satellites and the obstruction of universal observations.

=== Health ===
- Antibiotics – antibiotic resistance: Misuse of antibiotics anywhere in the world may eventually result in the global antibiotic resistance, both in human and agricultural settings, which would cause an irreparable harm to the societal health, seen as a common goods. The survey of Kieran S. O'Brien et al. stated that many consider the misuse of antibiotics to be the case of the "tragedy of the commons", however the research results in this respect were inconclusive (as of 2014).
- Vaccines – Herd immunity: Avoiding a vaccine shot and relying on the established herd immunity instead avoids potential vaccine risks, but if everyone does this, it diminishes herd immunity and bring risk to people who cannot receive vaccines for medical reasons. The analogy with the "tragedy of the commons" is based on the interpretation that the common goods here is the pool of the vaccinated people, and avoiding vaccination diminishes it.

=== Finance ===
- Government debt: Individual politicians can increase their popularity with deficit spending, but if all politicians do this, it can result in increasing public debt-to-GDP ratios and a debt crisis.
- Cost of raising a child: Voluntary childlessness can save money, but if everyone does this, it can result in a pension crisis.

=== Knowledge ===
- Knowledge commons encompass immaterial and collectively owned goods in the information age, including, for example:
  - Source code and software documentation in software projects that can get "polluted" with messy code or inaccurate information.
  - Skills acquisition and training, when all parties involved pass the buck on implementing it.

=== Climate ===
The effects of climate change have been given as a mass example of the tragedy of the commons. This perspective proposes that the earth, being the commons, has suffered a depletion of natural resources without regard to the externalities, the impact on neighboring and future populations. The collective actions of individuals, organisations, and governments continue to contribute to environmental degradation. Mitigation of the long-term impacts and tipping points require strict controls or other solution, but this may come as a loss to different industries. The sustainability of population and industry growth is the subject of climate change discussion. The global commons of environmental resource consumption or selfishness, as in the fossil fuel industry has been theorized as not realistically manageable. This is due to the crossing of irreversible thresholds of impact before the costs are entirely realised.

=== Digital commons ===
In the past two decades, scholars have been attempting to apply the concept of the tragedy of the commons to the digital environment. However, between scholars there are differences on some basic notions inherent to the tragedy of the commons: the idea of finite resources and the extent of pollution. On the other hand, there seems to be some agreement on the role of the digital divide and how to solve a potential tragedy of the digital commons.

Many digital resources have properties that make them vulnerable to the tragedy of the commons, including data, virtual artifacts, and even limited user attention. Closely related are the physical computational resources, such as CPU, RAM, and network bandwidth, that digital communities on shared servers rely upon and govern. Some scholars argue that digital resources are infinite, and therefore immune to the tragedy of the commons, because downloading a file does not constitute the destruction of the file in the digital environment, and because it can be replicated and disseminated throughout the digital environment. However, it can still be considered a finite resource within the context of privacy laws and regulations that limit access to it.

Finite digital resources can be digital commons. An example is a database that requires persistent maintenance, such as Wikipedia. As a non-profit, it survives because a network of people contributes to maintain a knowledge base without expectation of direct compensation. This digital resource can deplete because Wikipedia survives only if it is contributed to and used as a commons. The motivation for individuals to contribute is reflective of the theory because, if humans act in their own immediate interest and no longer participate, then the resource becomes misinformed or depleted. Arguments surrounding the regulation and mitigation requirements for digital resources may become reflective of natural resources.

This raises the question whether one can view access itself as a finite resource in the context of a digital environment. Some scholars argue this point, often pointing to a proxy for access that is more concrete and measurable. One such proxy is bandwidth, which can become congested when too many people try to access the digital environment. Alternatively, one can think of the network itself as a common resource that can be exhausted through overuse. Therefore, when talking about resources running out in a digital environment, it could be more useful to think in terms of the access to the digital environment being restricted in some way.

There are some scholars who look only at the pollution that occurs in the digital environment itself. They argue that unrestricted use of digital resources can cause an overproduction of redundant data, which causes noise and corrupts communication channels within the digital environment. Others argue that the pollution caused by the overuse of digital resources also causes pollution in the physical environment. They argue that unrestricted use of digital resources causes misinformation, fake news, crime, and terrorism, as well as problems of a different nature such as confusion, manipulation, insecurity, and loss of confidence.

=== Elapsed patents ===
Patents are effectively a limited-time exploitation monopoly given to inventors. Once the period has elapsed, the invention is in principle free to all, and many companies do indeed commercialise such products, now market-proven. However, around 50% of all patent applications do not reach successful commercialization at all, often due to immature levels of components or marketing failures by the innovators. Scholars have suggested that since investment is often connected to patentability, such inactive patents form a rapidly growing category of underprivileged technologies and ideas that, under current market conditions, are effectively unavailable for use. Thus, "Under the current system, people are encouraged to register new patents, and are discouraged from using publicly available patents." The case might be particularly relevant to technologies that are relatively more environmentally/human damaging but also somewhat costlier than other alternatives developed contemporaneously.

== Commons dilemma ==
The commons dilemma is a specific class of social dilemma in which people's short-term selfish interests are at odds with long-term group interests and the common good. In academia, a range of related terminology has also been used as shorthand for the theory or aspects of it, including resource dilemma, take-some dilemma, and common pool resource.

Commons dilemma researchers have studied conditions under which groups and communities are likely to under- or over-harvest common resources in both the laboratory and field. Research programs have concentrated on a number of motivational, strategic, and structural factors that might be conducive to management of commons.

In game theory, which constructs mathematical models for individuals' behaviour in strategic situations, the corresponding "game", developed by Hardin, is known as the Commonize Costs – Privatise Profits Game (CC–PP game).

=== Psychological factors ===
Kopelman, Weber, & Messick (2002), in a review of the experimental research on cooperation in commons dilemmas, identify nine classes of independent variables that influence cooperation in commons dilemmas: social motives, gender, payoff structure, uncertainty, power and status, group size, communication, causes, and frames. They organise these classes and distinguish between psychological individual differences (stable personality traits) and situational factors (the environment). Situational factors include both the task (social and decision structure) and the perception of the task.

Empirical findings support the theoretical argument that the cultural group is a critical factor that needs to be studied in the context of situational variables. Rather than behaving in line with economic incentives, people are likely to approach the decision to cooperate with an appropriateness framework. An expanded, four factor model of the Logic of Appropriateness, suggests that the cooperation is better explained by the question: "What does a person like me (identity) do (rules) in a situation like this (recognition) given this culture (group)?"

=== Strategic factors ===
Strategic factors also matter in commons dilemmas. One often-studied strategic factor is the order in which people take harvests from the resource. In simultaneous play, all people harvest at the same time, whereas in sequential play people harvest from the pool according to a predetermined sequence – first, second, third, etc. There is a clear order effect in the latter games: the harvests of those who come first – the leaders – are higher than the harvest of those coming later – the followers. The interpretation of this effect is that the first players feel entitled to take more. With sequential play, individuals adopt a first come-first served rule, whereas with simultaneous play people may adopt an equality rule. Another strategic factor is the ability to build up reputations. Research found that people take less from the common pool in public situations than in anonymous private situations. Moreover, those who harvest less gain greater prestige and influence within their group.

=== Structural factors ===
Hardin stated in his analysis of the tragedy of the commons that "Freedom in a commons brings ruin to all." One of the proposed solutions is to appoint a leader to regulate access to the common. Groups are more likely to endorse a leader when a common resource is being depleted and when managing a common resource is perceived as a difficult task. Groups prefer leaders who are elected, democratic, and prototypical of the group, and these leader types are more successful in enforcing cooperation. A general aversion to autocratic leadership exists, although it may be an effective solution, possibly because of the fear of power abuse and corruption.

The provision of rewards and punishments may also be effective in preserving common resources. Selective punishments for overuse can be effective in promoting domestic water and energy conservation – for example, through installing water and electricity meters in houses. Selective rewards work, provided that they are open to everyone. An experimental carpool lane in the Netherlands failed because car commuters did not feel they were able to organise a carpool. The rewards do not have to be tangible. In Canada, utilities considered putting "smiley faces" on electricity bills of customers below the average consumption of that customer's neighborhood.

=== Evolutionary biology ===
A parallel was drawn in 2006 between the tragedy of the commons and the competing behaviour of parasites that, through acting selfishly, eventually diminish or destroy their common host. The idea has also been applied to areas such as the evolution of virulence or sexual conflict, where males may fatally harm females when competing for matings.

The idea of evolutionary suicide, where adaptation at the level of the individual causes the whole species or population to be driven extinct, can be seen as an extreme form of an evolutionary tragedy of the commons. From an evolutionary point of view, the creation of the tragedy of the commons in pathogenic microbes may provide us with advanced therapeutic methods.

Microbial ecology studies have also addressed if resource availability modulates the cooperative or competitive behaviour in bacteria populations. When resources availability is high, bacterial populations become competitive and aggressive with each other, but when environmental resources are low, they tend to be cooperative and mutualistic.

Ecological studies have hypothesised that competitive forces between animals are major in high carrying capacity zones (i.e., near the Equator), where biodiversity is higher, because of natural resources abundance. This abundance or excess of resources, causes animal populations to have r reproduction strategies (many offspring, short gestation, less parental care, and a short time until sexual maturity), so competition is affordable for populations. Also, competition could select populations to have r behaviour in a positive feedback regulation.

Contrarily, in low carrying capacity zones (i.e., far from the equator), where environmental conditions are harsh, K strategies are common (longer life expectancy, produce relatively fewer offspring and tend to be altricial, requiring extensive care by parents when young) and populations tend to have cooperative or mutualistic behaviours. If populations have a competitive behaviour in hostile environmental conditions, they mostly are filtered out (die) by environmental selection; hence, populations in hostile conditions are selected to be cooperative.

== Solutions ==
Articulating solutions to the tragedy of the commons is one of the main problems of political philosophy. In some situations, locals implement (often complex) social schemes that work well. When these fail, there are many possible governmental solutions such as privatization, internalizing the externalities, and regulation.

=== Non-governmental solution ===
Robert Axelrod contends that even self-interested individuals often find ways to cooperate, because collective restraint serves both the collective and individual interests. Anthropologist G. N. Appell criticised those who cited Hardin to "impos[e] their own economic and environmental rationality on other social systems of which they have incomplete understanding and knowledge."

Political scientist Elinor Ostrom, who was awarded 2009's Nobel Memorial Prize in Economic Sciences for her work on the issue, and others revisited Hardin's work in 1999. They found the tragedy of the commons not as prevalent or as difficult to solve as Hardin maintained, since locals have often come up with solutions to the commons problem themselves. For example, another group found that a commons in the Swiss Alps has been run by a collective of farmers there to their mutual and individual benefit since 1517, in spite of the farmers also having access to their own farmland. In general, it is in the interest of the users of a commons to keep them functioning and so complex social schemes are often invented by the users for maintaining them at optimum efficiency. Another prominent example of this is the deliberative process of granting legal personhood to a part of nature, for example rivers, with the aim of preserving their water resources and prevent environmental degradation. This process entails that a river is regarded as its own legal entity that can sue against environmental damage done to it while being represented by an independently appointed guardian advisory group. This has happened as a bottom-up process in New Zealand: Here debates initiated by the Whanganui Iwi tribe have resulted in legal personhood for the river. The river is considered as a living whole, stretching from mountain to sea and even includes not only the physical but also its metaphysical elements.

Similarly, geographer Douglas L. Johnson remarks that many nomadic pastoralist societies of Africa and the Middle East in fact "balanced local stocking ratios against seasonal rangeland conditions in ways that were ecologically sound", reflecting a desire for lower risk rather than higher profit; in spite of this, it was often the case that "the nomad was blamed for problems that were not of his own making and were a product of alien forces." Independently finding precedent in the opinions of previous scholars such as Ibn Khaldun as well as common currency in antagonistic cultural attitudes toward non-sedentary peoples, governments and international organisations have made use of Hardin's work to help justify restrictions on land access and the eventual sedentarization of pastoral nomads despite its weak empirical basis. Examining relations between historically nomadic Bedouin Arabs and the Syrian state in the 20th century, Dawn Chatty notes that "Hardin's argument was curiously accepted as the fundamental explanation for the degradation of the steppe land" in development schemes for the arid interior of the country, downplaying the larger role of agricultural overexploitation in desertification as it melded with prevailing nationalist ideology that viewed nomads as socially backward and economically harmful.

Elinor Ostrom and her colleagues looked at how real-world communities manage communal resources, such as fisheries, land irrigation systems, and farmlands, and they identified a number of factors conducive to successful resource management. One factor is the resource itself; resources with definable boundaries (e.g. land) can be preserved much more easily. A second factor is resource dependence; there must be a perceptible threat of resource depletion, and it must be difficult to find substitutes. The third is the presence of a community; small and stable populations with a thick social network and social norms promoting conservation do better. A final condition is that there be appropriate community-based rules and procedures in place with built-in incentives for responsible use and punishments for overuse. When the commons is taken over by non-locals, those solutions can no longer be used.

Many of the economic and social structures recommended by Ostrom coincide with the structures recommended by anarchists, particularly green anarchism. The largest contemporary societies that use these organisational strategies are the Rebel Zapatista Autonomous Municipalities and the Autonomous Administration of North and East Syria, which have heavily been influenced by anarchism and other versions of libertarian and ecological socialism.

Individuals may act in a deliberate way to avoid consumption habits that deplete natural resources. This consciousness promotes the boycotting of products or brands and seeking alternative, more sustainable options.

==== Altruistic punishment ====
Various well-established theories, such as theory of kin selection and direct reciprocity, have limitations in explaining patterns of cooperation emerging between unrelated individuals and in non-repeatable short-term interactions. Studies have shown that punishment is an efficacious motivator for cooperation among humans.

Altruistic punishment entails the presence of individuals that punish defectors from a cooperative agreement, although doing so is costly and provides no material gain. These punishments effectively resolve tragedy of the commons scenarios by addressing both first-order free rider problems (i.e. defectors free riding on cooperators) and second-order free rider problems (i.e. cooperators free riding on work of punishers). Such results can be witnessed only when the punishment levels are high enough.

While defectors are motivated by self-interest and cooperators feel morally obliged to practice self-restraint, punishers pursue this path when their emotions are clouded by annoyance and anger at free riders.

=== Governmental solutions ===
Governmental solutions are used when the above conditions are not met (such as a community being larger than the cohesion of its social network). Examples of government regulation include population control, privatization, regulation, and internalizing the externalities.

==== Hardin on population control ====
In Hardin's essay, he proposed that the solution to the problem of overpopulation must be based on "mutual coercion, mutually agreed upon" and result in "relinquishing the freedom to breed". Hardin discussed this topic further in a 1979 book, Managing the Commons, co-written with John A. Baden. He framed this prescription in terms of needing to restrict the "reproductive right", to safeguard all other rights. Several countries have a variety of population control laws in place.

In the context of United States policy debates, Hardin advocated restrictions on migration, particularly of non-whites. In a 1991 article, he stated

Popular anthropology came along with its dogma that all cultures are equally good, equally valuable. To say otherwise was to be narrow-minded and prejudiced, to be guilty of the sin of ethnocentrism. In time, a sort of Marxist-Hegelian dialectic took charge of our thinking: ethnocentrism was replaced by what we can only call ethnofugalism—a romantic flight away from our own culture. That which was foreign and strange, particularly if persecuted, became the ideal. Black became beautiful, and prolonged bilingual education replaced naturalization. Immigration lawyers grew rich serving their clients by finding ways around the law of the land to which they (the lawyers) owe their allegiance. Idealistic religious groups, claiming loyalty to a higher power than the nation, openly shielded and transported illegal immigrants.

==== Privatization ====
One solution for some resources is to convert common good into private property (Coase 1960), giving the new owner an incentive to enforce its sustainability. Libertarians and classical liberals cite the tragedy of the commons as an example of what happens when Lockean property rights to homestead resources are prohibited by a government. They argue that the solution to the tragedy of the commons is to allow individuals to take over the property rights of a resource, that is, to privatise it.

In England, this solution was attempted in the inclosure acts. According to Karl Marx in Das Kapital, this solution leads to increasing numbers of people being pushed into smaller and smaller pockets of common land that has yet to be privatised, thereby merely displacing and exacerbating the problem while putting an increasing number of people in precarious situations. Economic historian Bob Allen coined the term "Engels' pause" to describe the period from 1790 to 1840, when British working-class wages stagnated and per-capita gross domestic product expanded rapidly during a technological upheaval.

==== Regulation ====
In a typical example, governmental regulations can limit the amount of a common good that is available for use by any individual. Permit systems for extractive economic activities including mining, fishing, hunting, livestock raising, and timber extraction are examples of this approach. Similarly, limits to pollution are examples of governmental intervention on behalf of the commons. This idea is used by the United Nations Moon Treaty, Outer Space Treaty, and Law of the Sea Treaty, as well as the UNESCO World Heritage Convention (treaty), which involves the international law principle that designates some areas or resources the Common Heritage of Mankind.

German historian Joachim Radkau thought Hardin advocates strict management of common goods via increased government involvement or international regulation bodies. An asserted impending "tragedy of the commons" is frequently warned of as a consequence of the adoption of policies that restrict private property and espouse expansion of public property.

Giving legal rights of personhood to objects in nature is another proposed solution. The idea of giving land a legal personality is intended to enable the democratic system of the rule of law to allow for prosecution, sanction, and reparation for damage to the earth. For example, this has been put into practice in Ecuador in the form of a constitutional principle known as "Pacha Mama" (Mother Earth).

==== Internalizing externalities ====
Privatization works when the person who owns the property (or rights of access to that property) pays the full price of its exploitation. As discussed above negative externalities (negative results, such as air or water pollution, that do not proportionately affect the user of the resource) is often a feature driving the tragedy of the commons. Internalizing the externalities, in other words ensuring that the users of resource pay for all of the consequences of its use, can provide an alternate solution between privatization and regulation. One example is gasoline taxes, intended to include both the cost of road maintenance and of air pollution. This solution can provide the flexibility of privatization while minimizing the amount of government oversight and overhead that is needed.

=== The mid-way solution ===
One of the significant actions areas that can dwell as potential solution is to have co-shared communities that have partial ownership from governmental side and partial ownership from the community. Ownership here refers to common use of the resource, allowing all players to plan and supervise use and mutually benefit, which ensure that power is not held in one or two hands only. Since involvement of multiple stakeholders is necessary, responsibilities can be shared across them based on their abilities and capacities.

=== Tragedy of digital commons solutions ===
Scholars disagree on the particularities underlying the tragedy of the digital commons; however, there does seem to be some agreement on the cause and the solution. The cause of the tragedy of the commons occurring in the digital environment is attributed by some scholars to the digital divide. They argue that there is too large a focus on bridging this divide and providing unrestricted access to everyone. Such a focus on increasing access without the necessary restrictions causes the exploitation of digital resources for individual self-interest that is underlying any tragedy of the commons.

In terms of the solution, scholars agree that cooperation rather than regulation is the best way to mitigate a tragedy of the digital commons. The digital world is not a closed system in which a central authority can regulate the users, as such some scholars argue that voluntary cooperation must be fostered. This could perhaps be done through digital governance structure that motivates multiple stakeholders to engage and collaborate in the decision-making process. Other scholars argue more in favor of formal or informal sets of rules, like a code of conduct, to promote ethical behaviour in the digital environment and foster trust. Alternative to managing relations between people, some scholars argue that it is access itself that needs to be properly managed, which includes expansion of network capacity.

== Criticism ==
=== Commons in historical reality ===
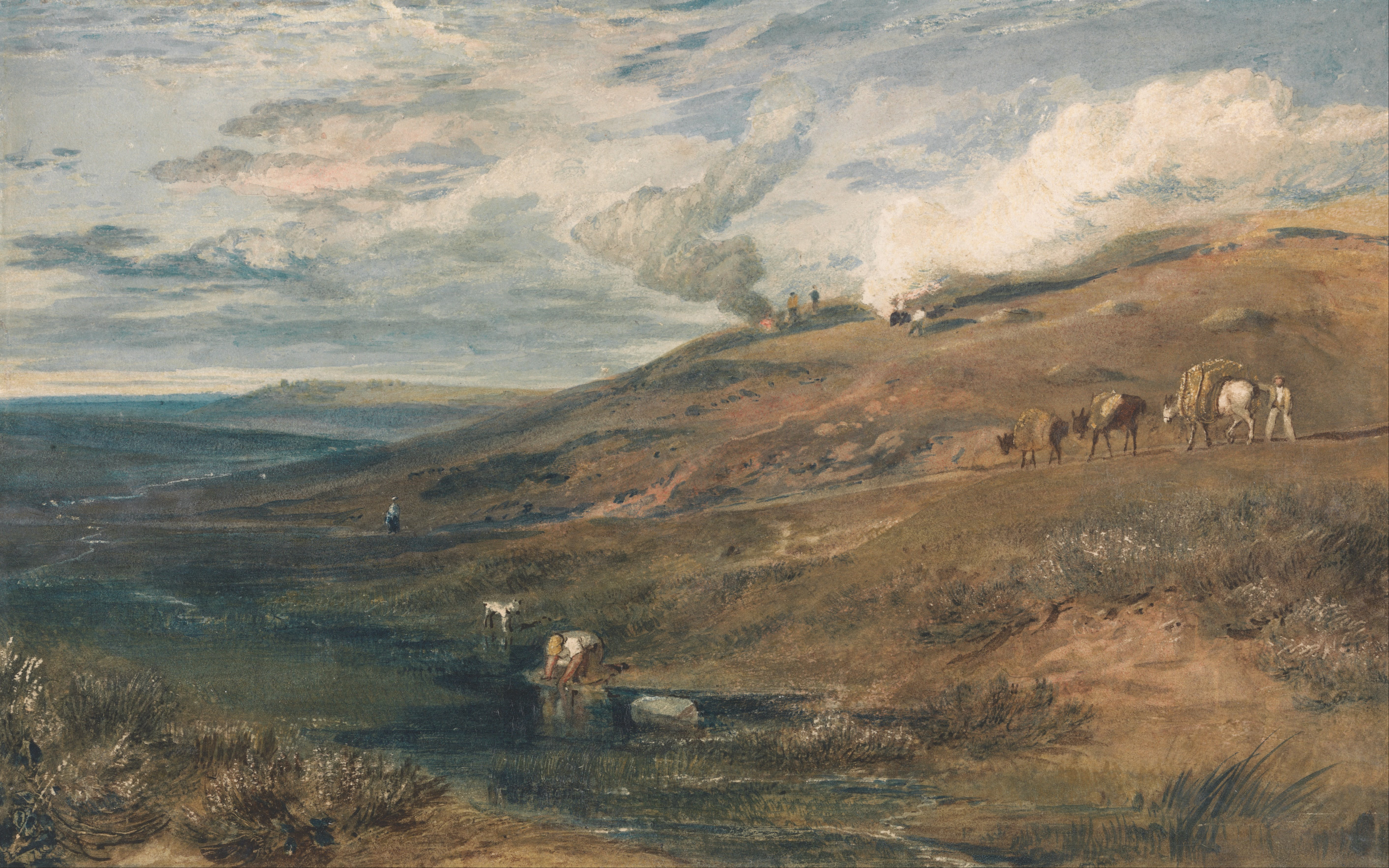
Common land in Dartmoor, England c. 1813 (watercolor, J. M. W. Turner)

The status of common land in England as mentioned in Lloyd's pamphlet has been widely misunderstood.

Millions of acres were "common land", but this did not mean public land open to everybody, a popular fallacy. There was no such thing as ownerless land. Every parcel of "common" land had a legal owner, who was a private person or corporation. The owner was called the lord of the manor (which, like landlord, was a legal term denoting ownership, not aristocratic status).

It was true that there were local people, called commoners, defined as those who had a legal right to use the common for some purpose of their own, typically grazing their animals. (Note: Other rights included gathering fallen wood for fuel (estovers); to dig peat for fuel and roofing (turbary); to fish in common waters (piscary); and to cut bracken for fuel and cattle-bedding. These rights had ancient origins. "Common rights were not something specifically granted by a generous landlord, but were the residue of rights that were once much more extensive, rights that are in all probability older than the modern conception of private property. They probably antedate the idea of private property in land, and are therefore of vast antiquity".) Certainly their rights were strong, because the lord was not entitled to build on his own land, or fence off any part of it, unless he could prove he had left enough pasture for the commoners. But these individuals were not the general public at large: not everyone in the vicinity was a commoner.

Furthermore, the commoners' right to graze the lord's land with their animals was restricted by law – precisely in order to prevent overgrazing. If overgrazing did nevertheless occur, which it sometimes did, it was because of incompetent or weak land management, and not because of the pressure of an unlimited right to graze, which did not exist.

Hence Christopher Rodgers said that "Hardin's influential thesis on the 'tragedy of the commons' ... has no application to common land in England and Wales. It is based on a false premise". Rodgers, professor of law at Newcastle University, added:

Far from suffering a tragedy of the commons in Hardin's sense, common land ... was subject to common law principles of customary origin that promoted 'sustainable management'. These were expressed through property rights, in the form of qualifications on the resource use conferred by property entitlements, and were administered by local manor courts ... Moreover, the administration of customary rules by the manor courts represented a wholly different means for organising the management of common resources than the model posited by Hardin, which stresses the need for exclusive ownership by either individuals or government in order to promote the effective management of the resource.

Every productive unit ("manor") had a manorial court; without it, the manor ceased to exist. Manorial courts could fine commoners, and the lord of the manor for that matter, for breaches of customary law, e.g. grazing too many cattle on the land. Customary law varied locally. It could not be altered without the consent of the whole body of the commoners, except by getting an Act of Parliament.

By the time of Lloyd's pamphlet (1833) the majority of land in England had been enclosed and had ceased to be common land. Lloyd took for granted that the commons pastures of his day were worse than enclosed pastures because of over grazing; he denied that they might have been less fertile land anyway; he did not examine other possible causes. In The Common Lands of England and Wales (1963) geographer Dudley Stamp asked why not all commons were enclosed: he attributed it to inferior soils. Mostly, commons had persisted where they were too poor to be worth enclosing; good common land had been enclosed. Co-author W.G. Hoskins the landscape historian was not convinced by contemporary claims that commons were overstocked and under-managed; he suspected they were self-serving statements on behalf of the enclosure movement. Land lawyer Thomas Scrutton said that common pasture was difficult to drain, to keep disease-free, and to use for improved cattle breeding.

Likewise, Susan Jane Buck Cox argues that the common land example used to argue this economic concept is on weak historical ground, and misrepresents what she terms was actually the "triumph of the commons": the successful common usage of land for many centuries. She argues that social changes and agricultural innovation, and not the behaviour of the commoners, led to the demise of the commons. In a similar vein, Carl Dahlman argues that commons were effectively managed to prevent overgrazing.

=== Others ===
Hardin's work is criticised as historically inaccurate in failing to account for the demographic transition, and for failing to distinguish between common-pool resources and open access resources. Radical environmentalist Derrick Jensen claims the tragedy of the commons is used as propaganda for private ownership. He says it has been used by the political right wing to hasten the final enclosure of the "common resources" of third world and indigenous people worldwide, as a part of the Washington Consensus. He argues that in true situations, those who abuse the commons would have been warned to desist and if they failed would have punitive sanctions against them. He says that rather than being called "The Tragedy of the Commons", it should be called "the Tragedy of the Failure of the Commons".

Marxist geographer David Harvey has a similar criticism: "The dispossession of indigenous populations in North America by 'productive' colonists, for instance, was justified because indigenous populations did not produce value", asking: "Why, for instance, do we not focus in Hardin's metaphor on the individual ownership of the cattle rather than on the pasture as a common?"

Some authors, like Yochai Benkler, say that with the rise of the Internet and digitalization, an economics system based on commons becomes possible again. He wrote in his book The Wealth of Networks in 2006 that cheap computing power plus networks enable people to produce valuable products through non-commercial processes of interaction: "as human beings and as social beings, rather than as market actors through the price system". He uses the term networked information economy to refer to a "system of production, distribution, and consumption of information goods characterized by decentralised individual action carried out through widely distributed, nonmarket means that do not depend on market strategies". He also coined the term commons-based peer production for collaborative efforts based on sharing information. Examples of commons-based peer production are Wikipedia, free and open source software and open-source hardware.

The tragedy of the commons has served as a pretext for powerful private companies and/or governments to introduce regulatory agents or outsourcing on less powerful entities or governments, for the exploitation of their natural resources. Powerful companies and governments can easily corrupt and bribe less powerful institutions or governments, to allow them exploit or privatise their resources, which causes more concentration of power and wealth in powerful entities. This phenomenon is known as the resource curse.

Other criticisms have focused on Hardin's racist and eugenicist views, claiming that his arguments are directed toward forcible population control, particularly for people of color.

== Comedy of the commons ==
In certain cases, exploiting a resource more may be a good thing. Carol M. Rose, in a 1986 article, discussed the concept of the "comedy of the commons", where the public property in question exhibits "increasing returns to scale" in usage (hence the phrase, "the more the merrier"), in that the more people use the resource, the higher the benefit to each one. Rose cites as examples commerce and group recreational activities. According to Rose, public resources with the "comedic" characteristic may suffer from under-investment rather than over-usage.

A modern example presented by Garrett Richards in environmental studies is that the issue of excessive carbon emissions can be tackled effectively only when the efforts are directly addressing the issues along with the collective efforts from the world economies. Additionally, the more that nations are willing to collaborate and contribute resources, the higher the chances are for successful technological developments.

== See also ==
- Bounded rationality – Making of satisfactory, not optimal, decisions
- Collective action problem – Type of social dilemma
- Conflict of interest – Situation when a party is involved in multiple interests
- Dutch disease – Theory in economics, the apparent causal relationship between the increase in the economic development of a specific sector (for example natural resources) and a decline in other sectors (like the manufacturing sector or agriculture).
- Externality – Imposed cost or benefit in economics
- Credentialism and educational inflation – Unnecessary increases in jobs' educational requirements
- The Evolution of Cooperation – 1984 book by Robert Axelrod
- Free-rider problem – Market failure benefitting non-paying users
- International Association for the Study of the Commons – Non-profit organization
- Jevons paradox – Efficiency leads to increased demand
- Nash equilibrium – Solution concept of a non-cooperative game
- Overfishing – Removal of any species of fish from water at a rate that the species cannot replenish
  - Shark finning – Illegal harvesting of fins from live sharks
  - Pacific bluefin tuna – Species of fish
- Panic buying – Unusual pattern of purchase, when consumers buy unusually large amounts of a product in anticipation of, or after, a disaster or perceived disaster, or in anticipation of an incredibly large price increase or shortage.
- Parasitism (social offense) – Crime of living at the expense of others
- Prisoner's dilemma – Standard example in game theory, wherein two parties may each act in an individually beneficial fashion to the detriment of both
- Race to the bottom – Economic competition scenario
- Resource curse – Theory that resource wealth slows growth
- Social trap – Type of 'tragedy of the commons'
- Somebody else's problem – Dismissive figure of speech
- Stone Soup – European folk story, the inverse of the tragedy
- Tragedy of the anticommons – Type of resource coordination breakdown
- Tyranny of small decisions – Economic phenomenon, a situation in which a number of decisions, individually small and insignificant in size and time perspective, cumulatively result in a larger and significant outcome that is neither optimal nor desired.
- Unscrupulous diner's dilemma – Game theory dilemma
- Unintended consequences – Unforeseen outcomes of an action
- Universalisability – Concept in Kantian ethics
- Volunteer's dilemma – Game theory case weighing own/others' sacrifice, in which each player can either make a small sacrifice that benefits everybody, or instead wait in hope of benefiting from someone else's sacrifice

=== Related concepts ===
- Enclosure – In England, appropriation of common land, depriving commoners of their ancient rights
