= Lifeboat ethics =

Metaphor for resource distribution proposed by Garrett Hardin

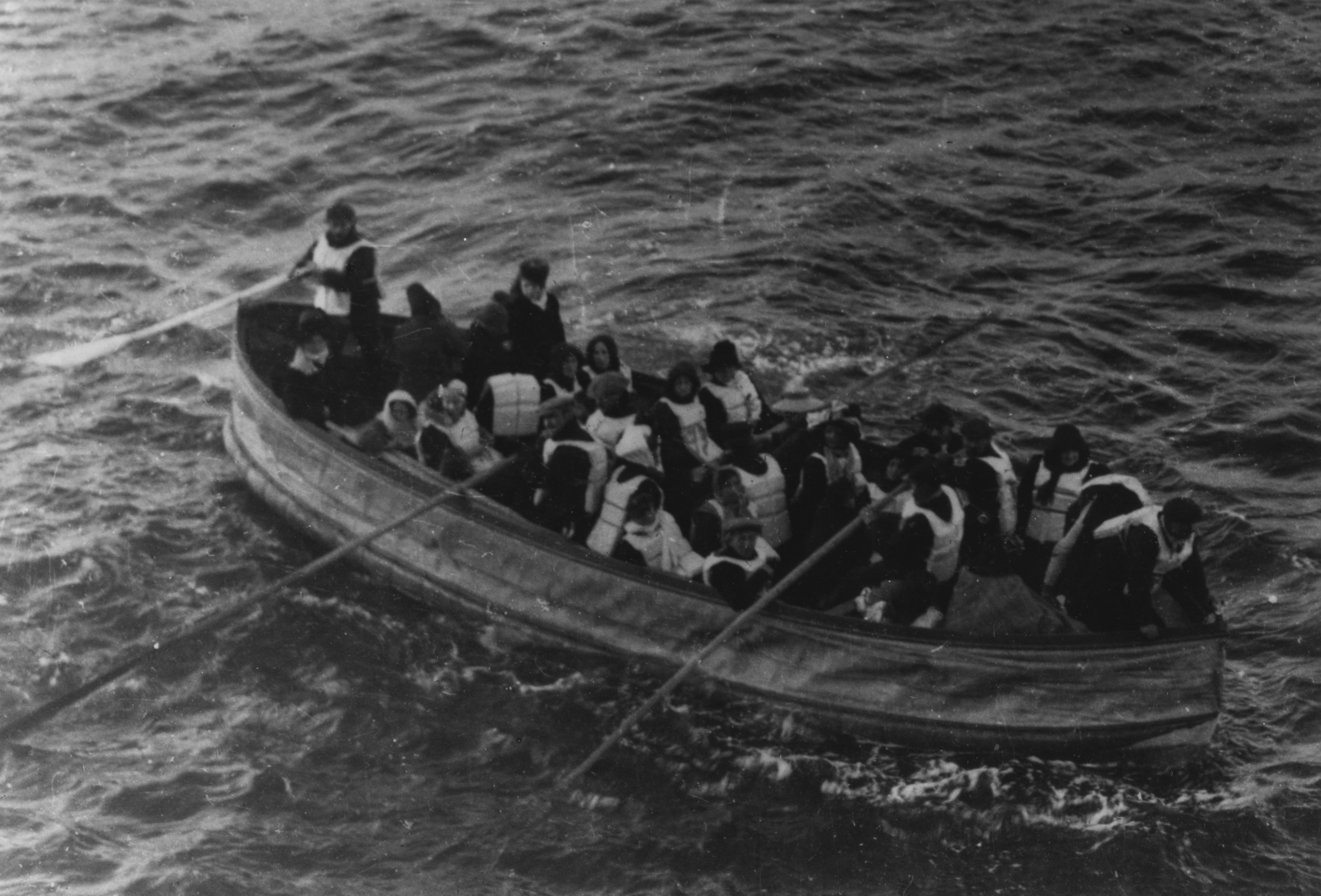
Hardin uses the metaphor of a lifeboat to make his argument.

Lifeboat ethics is a metaphor for resource distribution proposed by the ecologist Garrett Hardin in two articles published in 1974, building on his earlier 1968 article detailing "The tragedy of the commons". Hardin's 1974 metaphor describes a lifeboat bearing fifty people with room for ten more. The lifeboat is in an ocean surrounded by a hundred swimmers. The ethics of the situation stem from the dilemma of whether (and under what circumstances) swimmers should be taken aboard the lifeboat.

Hardin compared the lifeboat metaphor to the Spaceship Earth model of resource distribution, which he criticizes by asserting that a spaceship would be directed by a single leader which the Earth lacks. Hardin asserts that the spaceship model leads to the tragedy of the commons. In contrast, the lifeboat metaphor presents individual lifeboats as rich nations and the swimmers as poor nations.

== Development ==
Lifeboat ethics is closely related to issues in environmental ethics, utilitarianism, and resource depletion.

=== "Tragedy of the Commons" ===
Hardin's 1968 "Tragedy of the Commons" article calls attention to the problem of human overpopulation, and describes his perception of the current prevailing sentiment, which he asserts was influenced by Adam Smith's invisible hand concept of economics, leading to a general belief "that decisions reached individually will, in fact, be the best decisions for an entire society." Hardin rebutted that sentiment by citing an 1833 pamphlet written by William Forster Lloyd, giving an example in which allowing herdsmen unfettered access to a shared resource (in this case, a commons or pasture ground) would result in each herdsman concluding it was in their best interest to add more animals to their herd, inevitably leading to the exhaustion of that finite resource. He concluded: "Ruin is the destination toward which all men rush, each pursuing his own best interest in a society that believes in the freedom of the commons. Freedom in a commons brings ruin to all."

In the same 1968 article, he states the welfare state had created a situation that disrupted the natural state where "parents who bred too exuberantly would leave fewer descendants, not more, because they would be unable to care adequately for their children", and asked "how shall we deal with the family, the religion, the race, or the class (or indeed any distinguishable and cohesive group) that adopts overbreeding as a policy to secure its own aggrandizement?" He argued that "freedom to breed" coupled "with the belief that everyone born has an equal right to the commons [the world's resources]" would inevitably lead to disaster.

=== Lifeboat articles ===
In 1974, Hardin published two articles describing his view of "lifeboat ethics" in Psychology Today and BioScience. At the time, based on per-capita gross national product, Hardin asserted that approximately two-thirds of the world's population was "desperately poor" and the remaining one-third was "comparatively rich" before launching his metaphor of each rich country being in a full lifeboat, while poor countries were in "much more crowded lifeboats"; he described emigration as a continuous process where "the poor fall out of their lifeboats and swim for a while in the water outside, hoping to be admitted to a rich lifeboat, or in some other way to benefit from the 'goodies' on board" before asking what the rich lifeboat should do.

To make the metaphor more concrete, Hardin adds the lifeboat's capacity (60), current status (50 on board, and 100 swimmers), and proposes three potential solutions:

1. All 100 swimmers are brought on board, swamping the boat and leading to all dying, which Hardin calls "complete justice, complete catastrophe".
2. 10 of the 100 swimmers are selected to be brought on board. Hardin asserts the reduction in safety factor to zero will be paid for dearly "sooner or later", and asks "which ten do we let in?"
3. Admit none of the swimmers, ensuring the survival of those already on board, "though we shall have to be on our guard against boarding parties."

Other issues which can be raised include:

- How do you choose who the ten seats go to?
- Can you let ten more on without losing the boat to the frantic effort of the remaining 90 swimmers trying to board?
- Is it acceptable to deny an obviously dying passenger food and water to save it for others with a better chance to make it?
- Is it acceptable to jettison the dying passenger (knowing they will die within minutes) to make room for someone else?
- If food is low:
  - is cannibalism of corpses acceptable after they die?
  - is it acceptable, if it is certain they are going to die in a day or two, to murder them to preserve resources or to let someone on the boat?
  - is it acceptable, if it is certain they are going to die in a day or two, to murder them in order to commit cannibalism of their corpse where this will allow the survivors to survive for several additional weeks?

The third point regarding low supply of food had happened in reality before. A British court, in the ruling of R v Dudley and Stephens, ruled that necessity is not a defense of murder.

Hardin uses lifeboat ethics to question policies such as foreign aid, immigration, and food banks.

== See also ==
- Balloon debate
- Carrying capacity
- Food for Peace
- Population control
- Ratchet effect
- Repugnant conclusion
- Survival of the fittest
- The Winnowing
- Triage
- Trolley problem
- Women and children first
- Zero population growth
