= Silke Helfrich =

German activist

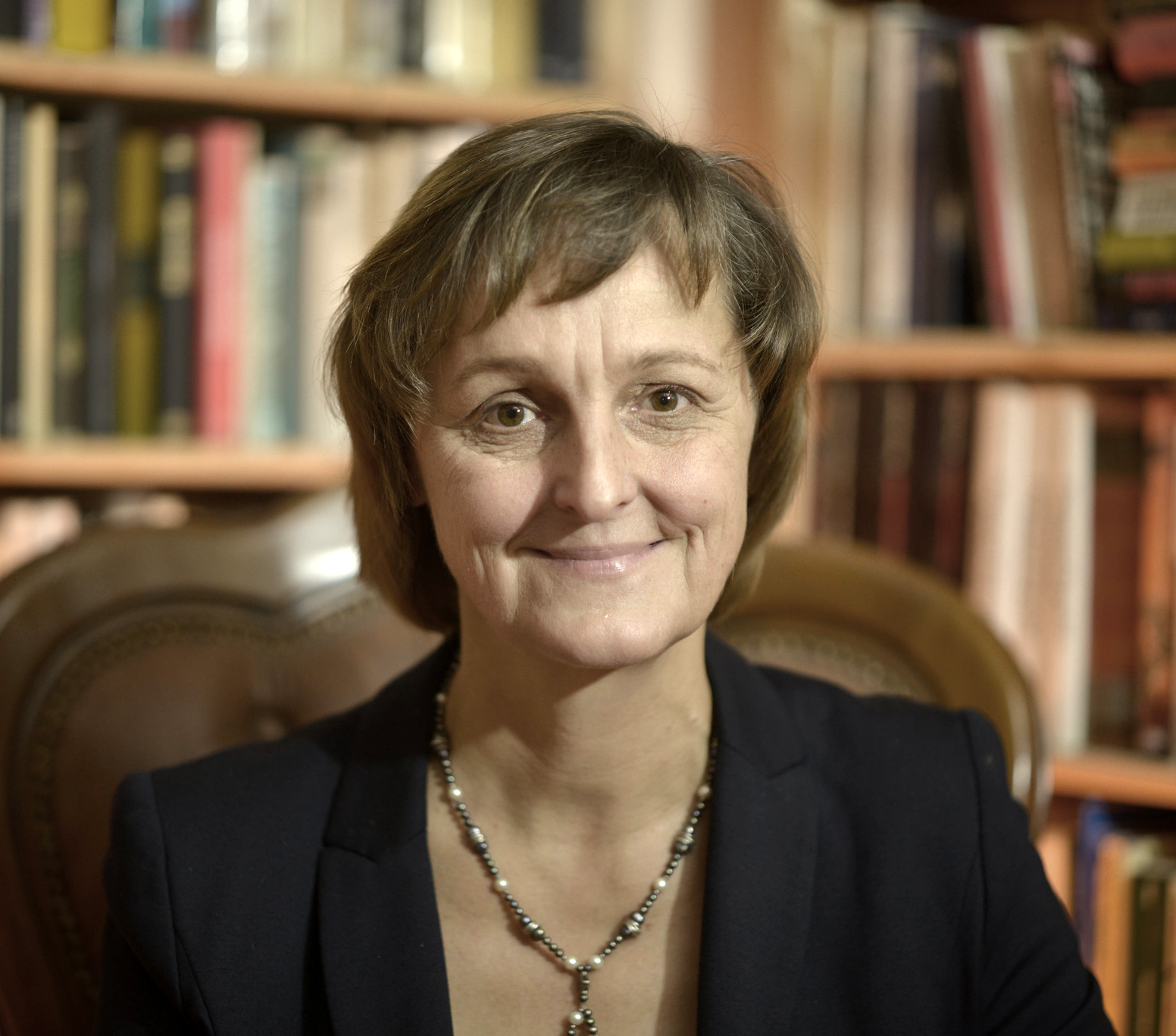
- Helfrich in 2021
- Born: 1967; Thuringia, Germany
- Died: 10 November 2021 (aged 53–54); Alps
- Education: Leipzig University
- Occupations: Writer, activist, scholar
- Organization: Heinrich Boll Foundation
- Known for: Commons
- Website: commons.blog

Silke Helfrich (1967 – 10 November 2021) was a German author, activist and scholar, best known for her contributions to the commons as a socio-political paradigm. Along with her frequent coauthor David Bollier, she was considered one of the most important international voices on the commons. She was regional director for Latin America at the Heinrich Böll Foundation, the think tank of the German Green Party.

== Education and career ==
She was born in 1967, in a small village in the Thuringian part of the Rhoen Mountains. She studied romance languages and pedagogy at the Leipzig University, which enabled her to speak 6 languages. After some time in development politics, she joined the Heinrich Böll Foundation, the think tank foundation of the German Green Party. First she was its CEO for Thuringia until 1999, and later regional director for Latin America until 2007. During this time, she focused on globalization, gender and human rights topics. Later she would acknowledge how her 8 years living in Latin America made her interested in the commons.

Since 2007 she worked as an independent author, activist and scholar, with a diversity of international partners. In this time, she authored multiple books on the commons, both in English and German. She was friend of Nobel laureate Elinor Ostrom, and translated her works to German. And she was regular co-author of commons scholar David Bollier. Her last book where she defines patterns of commoning following the work of Christopher Alexander, was translated to German, Spanish, French, and Greek. Her books have received ample praise, e.g. "thinking the better world of tomorrow", "a new paradigm for the organization of public and private life". "Silke Helfrich has achieved a true masterpiece with the work", "a truly exciting glimpse into what the world after this one might look like".

During this time, she regularly engaged with academics, practitioners and policy-makers, especially those related to the Green Party. She was part of the board of multiple research projects, on P2P technologies, ecology, or as part of the International Association for the Study of the Commons.

== Activism and social engagement ==
Helfrich participated in and co-founded multiple commons-related initiatives. She created her Commons Blog in 2007, writing regularly since then on the topic. From there, she argued in favor of commons as a process, "commoning" as a new narrative, and supported commons-oriented initiatives worldwide and in multiple languages. Later she would relate her "commoning" with the "buen vivir" concept (originally sumak kawsay) from modern Latin American socialism, the Venezuelan co-operative Cecosesola, or the Transition Towns movement

She co-founded the Commons Strategies Group along with David Bollier and Michel Bauwens, although the latter left it in 2018. As part of this group, she coauthored reports for the Institute for Advanced Sustainability Studies, and especially reports estemming from international commons conferences and workshops in Berlin, Lehnin, and Blankensee.

From 2008 to 2013, Helfrich co-organized an interdisciplinary political salon called “Time for the Commons” at the Heinrich Böll Foundation. And from 2012 until 2021, she co-organized annual commons summer schools for people to "co-creatively experience commoning and internalize it", and they have continued since her death.

In her native Germany, she co-founded the Commons Institute, the Network for Economic Transformation, and she is acknowledged as instigator for the creation of the Fuchsmühlen network in Werra-Meißner, and the German Open Source Seeds initiative. She is also referenced as convener of the Argentinian Fundación Vía Libre.

== Death ==
Helfrich was a frequent hiker, and while hiking in the Liechtenstein Alps on 10 November 2021 she suffered a fatal accident. A long list of institutions published obituaries then, including e.g. Dutch Casco Art Institute, the Heinrich Böll Foundation, and its South African branch, the Commons Network, the Argentinian Fundación Vía Libre or the German newspaper Die Tageszeitung. The Commons Institute plans to establish a foundation in her name. She was mother of two adult children.

== Selected works ==
- Bollier, David; Helfrich, Silke (2019). Free, fair, and alive: the insurgent power of the Commons. Gabriola Island: New Society Publishers. ISBN 978-0-86571-921-7.
- Bollier, David; Helfrich, Silke; Commons Strategies Group, eds. (2015). Patterns of commoning. Amherst/Mass: CSG - Commons Strategies Group. ISBN 978-1-937146-83-2.
- Bollier, David; Helfrich, Silke; Commons Strategies Group, eds. (2012). The wealth of the commons: a world beyond market and state. Amherst, Mass: Levellers Press. ISBN 978-1-937146-14-6.
- Ostrom, Elinor; Helfrich, Silke (2012). Was mehr wird, wenn wir teilen: vom gesellschaftlichen Wert der Gemeingüter [What becomes more when we share. On the social value of the commons] (in German) (2. Auflage ed.). München: oekom verlag. ISBN 978-3-86581-251-3.
- Ostrom, Elinor (2009). Helfrich, Silke (ed.). Wem gehört die Welt? zur Wiederentdeckung der Gemeingüter [Who Owns the World? The Rediscovery of the Commons] (in German). Heinrich-Böll-Stiftung (2. Auflage ed.). München: Oekom-Verl., Ges. für Ökologische Kommunikation. ISBN 978-3-86581-133-2.

== See also ==
- Commons
- Buen vivir
- David Bollier
