= IASC =

IASC may refer to:

- The UK's Independent Anti-Slavery Commissioner
- International Accounting Standards Committee
- International Arctic Science Committee
- International Association for Statistical Computing
- International Association for the Study of the Commons
- International Association of Skateboard Companies
- the Inter-Agency Standing Committee of the United Nations for coordination of humanitarian assistance
