= International Association for the Study of the Commons =

Non-profit organization

The International Association for the Study of the Commons (IASC) was founded in 1989 as The International Association for the Study of Common Property (IASCP). It is a non-for-profit organization that sees as its mission to further the understanding of institutions for the management of resources that are or could be held or used collectively as a commons by communities in developing and industrialized countries.

According to its vision statement, the goals of the association are:

- to encourage exchange of knowledge on the commons among diverse disciplines, areas, and resource types
- to foster mutual exchange of scholarship and practical experience
- to promote appropriate institutional design

== International Journal of the Commons ==
IASC publishes the International Journal of the Commons, "an interdisciplinary peer-reviewed open-access journal ... dedicated to furthering the understanding of institutions for use and management of resources that are (or could be) enjoyed collectively." The journal's editors-in-chief are Frank van Laerhoven (Utrecht University) and Michael Schoon (Arizona State University).

== Conferences ==
The association organizes biennial global conferences as well as regional conferences. In 2012, it also organized the first First Thematic Conference on the Knowledge Commons.

== See also ==
- Common land
- Tragedy of the commons
- Information Commons
- Knowledge commons
- Commons-based peer production
