= Garrett Hardin =

American ecologist (1915–2003)

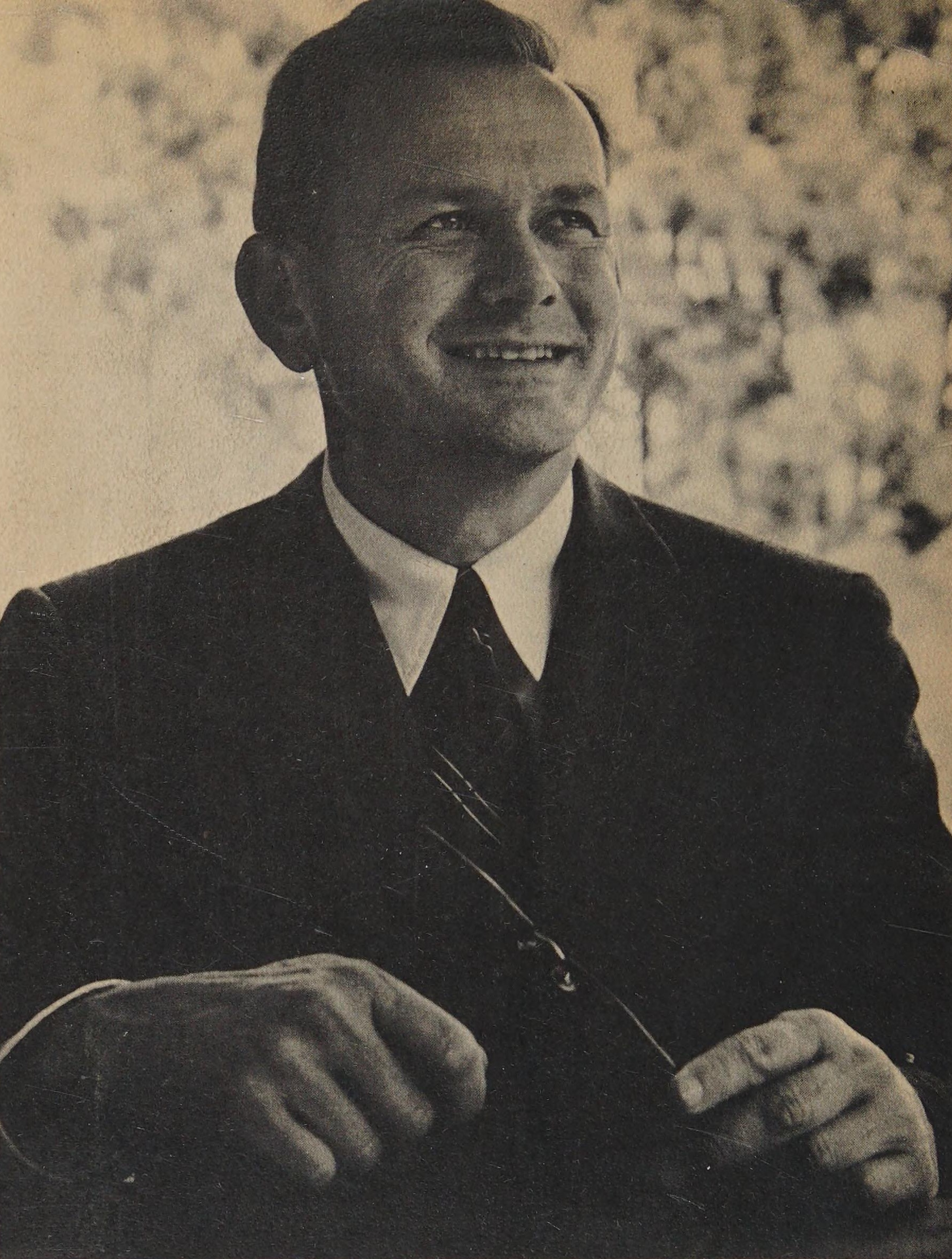
- Hardin, c. 1959
- Born: April 21, 1915; Dallas, Texas, U.S.
- Died: September 14, 2003 (aged 88); Santa Barbara, California, U.S.
- Education: University of Chicago (BS); Stanford University (PhD)
- Known for: "The Tragedy of the Commons" (essay)
- Scientific career
- Fields: Ecology

Garrett James Hardin (April 21, 1915 – September 14, 2003) was an American ecologist and microbiologist. He focused his career on the issue of human overpopulation, and is best known for his exposition of the tragedy of the commons in a 1968 paper of the same title in Science, which called attention to "the damage that innocent actions by individuals can inflict on the environment". He is also known for Hardin's First Law of Human Ecology: "We can never do merely one thing. Any intrusion into nature has numerous effects, many of which are unpredictable."

Hardin held hardline anti-immigrant positions as well as positions on race and eugenics that have led multiple sources to label him a white nationalist. The Southern Poverty Law Center described his publications as "frank in their racism and quasi-fascist ethnonationalism".

== Biography ==
Hardin received a BS in zoology from the University of Chicago in 1936 and a PhD in microbiology from Stanford University in 1941 where his dissertation research addressed symbiosis among microorganisms. Moving to the University of California, Santa Barbara in 1946, he served there as Professor of Human Ecology from 1963 until his (nominal) retirement in 1978. He was among the first members of the Society for General Systems Research.

== Major works and positions ==
A major focus of his career, and one to which he returned repeatedly, was the issue of human overpopulation. This led to writings on controversial subjects such as advocating abortion rights, which earned him criticism from the political right, and advocating strict limits to all immigration, which earned him criticism from the political left. In his essays, he also tackled subjects such as conservation and creationism. He was also a proponent of eugenics; his membership in the American Eugenics Society dates to 1956, and Hardin served as a director from 1971 to 1974 (the American Eugenics Society changed its name to the Society for the Study of Social Biology in 1973).

=== Neomalthusian approach and "The Tragedy of the Commons" ===
In 1968, Hardin applied his conceptual model developed in his essay "The Tragedy of the Commons" to human population growth, the use of the Earth's natural resources, and the welfare state. His essay cited an 1833 pamphlet by the English economist William Forster Lloyd which included an example of herders sharing a common parcel of land, which would lead to overgrazing.

Hardin blamed the welfare state for allowing the tragedy of the commons; he claimed that where the state provides for children and supports large families as a fundamental human right, Malthusian catastrophe is inevitable. Hardin stated in his analysis of the tragedy of the commons that "Freedom in a commons brings ruin to all." Environmental historians Joachim Radkau, Alfred Thomas Grove and Oliver Rackham criticized Hardin "as an American with no notion at all how Commons actually work".

In addition, Hardin's pessimistic outlook was subsequently contradicted by Elinor Ostrom's later work on success of co-operative structures like the management of common land, for which she shared the 2009 Nobel Memorial Prize in Economic Sciences with Oliver E. Williamson. In contrast to Hardin, they stated neither commons or "Allmende" in the generic nor classical meaning are bound to fail; to the contrary "the wealth of the commons" has gained renewed interest in the scientific community. Hardin's work was also criticized as historically inaccurate in failing to account for the demographic transition, and for failing to distinguish between common property and open access resources.

Despite the criticisms, the theory has nonetheless been influential.

=== Living Within Limits ===
In 1993, Garrett Hardin published Living Within Limits: Ecology, Economics, and Population Taboos, which he described at the time as a summation of all his previous works. The book won the 1993 Phi Beta Kappa Award in Science. In the book, he argues that the natural sciences are grounded in the concept of limits (such as the speed of light), while social sciences, such as economics, are grounded in concepts that have no limits (such as the widespread "infinite-Earth" economic models). He notes that most of the more notable scientific (as opposed to political) debates concerning ecological economics are between natural scientists, such as Paul R. Ehrlich, and economists, such as Julian Simon, one of Ehrlich's most well known and vocal detractors. A strong theme throughout the book is that economics, as a discipline, can be as much about mythology and ideology as it is about real science.

Hardin goes on to label those who reflexively argue for growth as "growthmaniacs", and argues against the institutional faith in exponential growth on a finite planet. Typical of Hardin's writing style, he illustrates exponential growth by way of a Biblical metaphor. Using compound interest, or "usury", he starts from the infamous "thirty pieces of silver" and, using five percent compounded interest, finds that after around 2,000 years, "every man, woman, and child would be entitled to only (!) 160,000 earth-masses of gold". As a consequence, he argues that any economy based on long-term compound interest must eventually fail due to the physical and mathematical impossibility of long-term exponential growth on a finite planet. Hardin writes, "At this late date millions of people believe in the fertility of money with an ardor seldom accorded to traditional religious doctrines". He argues that, contrary to some socially-motivated claims, population growth is also exponential growth, therefore even a little would be disastrous anywhere in the world, and that even the richest nations are not immune.

== Personal life ==
=== Participation in death-with-dignity movement and suicide ===
Hardin, who suffered from a heart disorder and post-polio syndrome, and his wife, Jane, who suffered from Lou Gehrig's disease, were members of End-of-Life Choices, formerly known as the Hemlock Society.

Believing in individuals' choice of when to die, they killed themselves in their Santa Barbara home in September 2003, shortly after their 62nd wedding anniversary. He was 88 and she was 81.

=== Controversies ===
Hardin caused controversy for his support of anti-immigrant causes during his lifetime. The Southern Poverty Law Center noted that Hardin served on the board of the Federation for American Immigration Reform and Social Contract Press and co-founded the anti-immigration Californians for Population Stabilization and The Environmental Fund, which according to the SPLC "served to lobby Congress for nativist and isolationist policies".

In 1994, he was one of 52 signatories on "Mainstream Science on Intelligence", an editorial written by Linda Gottfredson and published in the Wall Street Journal, which declared the consensus of the signing scholars on issues related to race and intelligence following the publication of the book The Bell Curve.

Hardin's last book The Ostrich Factor: Our Population Myopia (1999), a warning about the threat of overpopulation to the Earth's sustainable economic future, called for coercive constraints on "unqualified reproductive rights" and argued that affirmative action is a form of racism.

== Works ==
=== Books ===
- 1949, Biology: Its Human Implications W. H. Freeman
- 1952, Biology: Its Human Implications, Second Edition W. H. Freeman
- 1959, Nature and Man's Fate, Rinehart & Co.
- 1961, Biology Its Principles and Implications W. H. Freeman
- 1966, Biology Its Principles and Implications, Second Edition W. H. Freeman
- 1972, Exploring new ethics for survival: the voyage of the spaceship Beagle Viking Press. ISBN 0670302686
- 1973, Stalking the Wild Taboo W. Kaufmann. ISBN 0913232033
- 1974, Mandatory Motherhood: The True Meaning of 'Right to Life' Beacon Press. ISBN 0807021776
- 1977, The Limits of Altruism: an Ecologist's view of Survival Indiana University Press. ISBN 0253334357
- 1980, Promethean Ethics: Living With Death, Competition, and Triage University of Washington Press. ISBN 0295957174
- 1982, Naked Emperors: Essays of a Taboo-Stalker William Kaufmann, Inc. ISBN 0865760322
- 1985, Filters Against Folly, How to Survive despite Economists, Ecologists, and the Merely Eloquent Viking Penguin. ISBN 067080410X
- 1993, Living Within Limits: Ecology, Economics, and Population Taboos Oxford University Press. ISBN 0195093852
- 1999, The Ostrich Factor: Our Population Myopia Oxford University Press. ISBN 0195122747

=== Selected journal articles ===
- Hardin, G. (1960). "The Competitive Exclusion Principle". Science. 131 (3409): 1292–1297. Bibcode:1960Sci...131.1292H. doi:10.1126/science.131.3409.1292. PMID 14399717.
- Hardin, G (1968). "The Tragedy of the Commons". Science. 162 (3859): 1243–1248. Bibcode:1968Sci...162.1243H. doi:10.1126/science.162.3859.1243. PMID 5699198.
- Hardin, G. (1969). "Not peace, but ecology". Brookhaven Symposia in Biology. 22: 151–161. PMID 4906521.
- Hardin, G. (1970). "Everybody's guilty. The ecological dilemma". California Medicine. 113 (5): 40–47. PMC 1501799. PMID 5485232.
- Hardin, G. (1974). "Commentary: Living on a Lifeboat". BioScience. 24 (10): 561–568. doi:10.2307/1296629. JSTOR 1296629. PMID 11661143.
- Hardin, Garrett (1974). "Lifeboat Ethics: the Case Against Helping the Poor". Psychology Today. 8: 38–43.
- Hardin, Garrett (November 1976). "Living with Faustian Bargain". Bulletin of the Atomic Scientists. 32 (8): 25–29. Bibcode:1976BuAtS..32i..25H. doi:10.1080/00963402.1976.11455655. ISSN 0096-3402.
- Hardin, G. (1980). "Ecology and the Death of Providence". Zygon. 15: 57–68. doi:10.1111/j.1467-9744.1980.tb00376.x. S2CID 143248342.
- Hardin, G. (1982). "Discriminating Altruisms". Zygon. 17 (2): 163–186. doi:10.1111/j.1467-9744.1982.tb00477.x.
- Hardin, G. (1983). "Is Violence Natural?". Zygon. 18 (4): 405–413. doi:10.1111/j.1467-9744.1983.tb00524.x.
- Hardin, G. (1985). "Human Ecology: The Subversive, Conservative Science". Integrative and Comparative Biology. 25 (2): 469–476. doi:10.1093/icb/25.2.469.
- Hardin, G. (1986). "AIBS News". BioScience. 36 (9): 599–606. doi:10.1093/bioscience/36.9.599. JSTOR 1310194.
- Hardin, G. (1994). "The tragedy of the unmanaged commons". Trends in Ecology & Evolution. 9 (5): 199. Bibcode:1994TEcoE...9..199H. doi:10.1016/0169-5347(94)90097-3. PMID 21236819.
- Hardin, G. (1998). "Essays on Science and Society: Extensions of "The Tragedy of the Commons"". Science. 280 (5364): 682–683. doi:10.1126/science.280.5364.682. hdl:10535/3915. S2CID 153844385.

=== Chapters in books ===
- 1993. The entire text of Garrett Hardin's Living Within Limits: Ecology, Economics, and Population Taboos, Chapter Eight, Growth: Real and Spurious Reprinted at GarrettHardinSociety.org, by permission of Oxford University Press, Inc
- 1991. "Paramount positions in ecological economics." In Costanza, R. (editor) Ecological Economics: The Science and Management of Sustainability, New York: Columbia University Press. ISBN 0231075626
- 1991. "The tragedy of the 'Unmanaged' commons – population and the disguises of providence." In: R. V. Andelson, (editor), Commons Without Tragedy, London: Shepheard-Walwyn, pp. 162–185. ISBN 0389209589 (U.S.)

=== Awards and honors ===
- Hardin was elected to the American Academy of Arts and Sciences in 1973.
- Hardin was elected to the American Philosophical Society in 1974.
- Hardin's 1993 book Living Within Limits: Ecology, Economics, and Population Taboos, received the 1993 Award in Science from Phi Beta Kappa society.

== See also ==
- Bioethics
- Commonize costs–privatize profits game
- Earth system science
- Ecofascism
- Multiculturalism
- Ratchet effect
- Taboo
