= CC–PP game =

Concept in resource allocation to explain economic decision-making

The Commonize Costs–Privatize Profits Game (or CC–PP Game) is a concept developed by the ecologist Garrett Hardin to describe a "game" (in the game theory sense) widely played in matters of resource allocation. The concept is Hardin's interpretation of the closely related phenomenon known as the tragedy of the commons, and is referred to in political discourse as "privatizing profits and socializing losses."

The CC–PP Game originally appeared in Hardin's book titled Filters against Folly: How To Survive Despite Economists, Ecologists, and the Merely Eloquent which was published in 1986.

Players of the CC–PP Game aim to commonize the costs (or externalities) generated by their activities across the wider community, while privatizing all profits (financial or otherwise) to themselves. The individual does not broadcast that they are playing the game in order to continue profiting.

Hardin related the CC–PP Game to ecological problems such mining, groundwater overdraft, cattle ranching and other actions that cause the depletion of natural resources or an increase in pollution.

== Tragedy of the Commons and the CC–PP Game ==
The CC–PP Game is used to explain how individuals utilize public goods, specifically scarce natural resources. These goods include resources such as clean air, rivers, forests and groundwater. These are public goods because they are both non-excludable and non-rival. It is very difficult to assign property rights to public goods, which results in many people using the resource and the resource's subsequent depletion or the tragedy of the commons.

Hardin uses the original conception of the commons as a "village pasture used for grazing sheep or cattle in preindustrial England." The pasture was a public space for any villager to use to graze their livestock. Villagers gained profit from each additional animal on the pasture, but did not have to pay the costs of the animals depleting the grass. The village as a whole took on the cost of overgrazing the pasture. This represented the CC–PP Game for Hardin in which the incentive to create individual profit was greater than the cost of overgrazing the field since it was spread out between many individuals.

In a more modern example of the CC–PP Game, Hardin attributes the desertification of the Sahel desert to "unmanaged access and overuse."

John D. Aram summarized the tragedy of the commons and the CC–PP Game stating, "Tragic macro effects result from a structure of micro incentives that allows unmanaged access to a fixed resource."

== Game Theory and the CC–PP Game ==
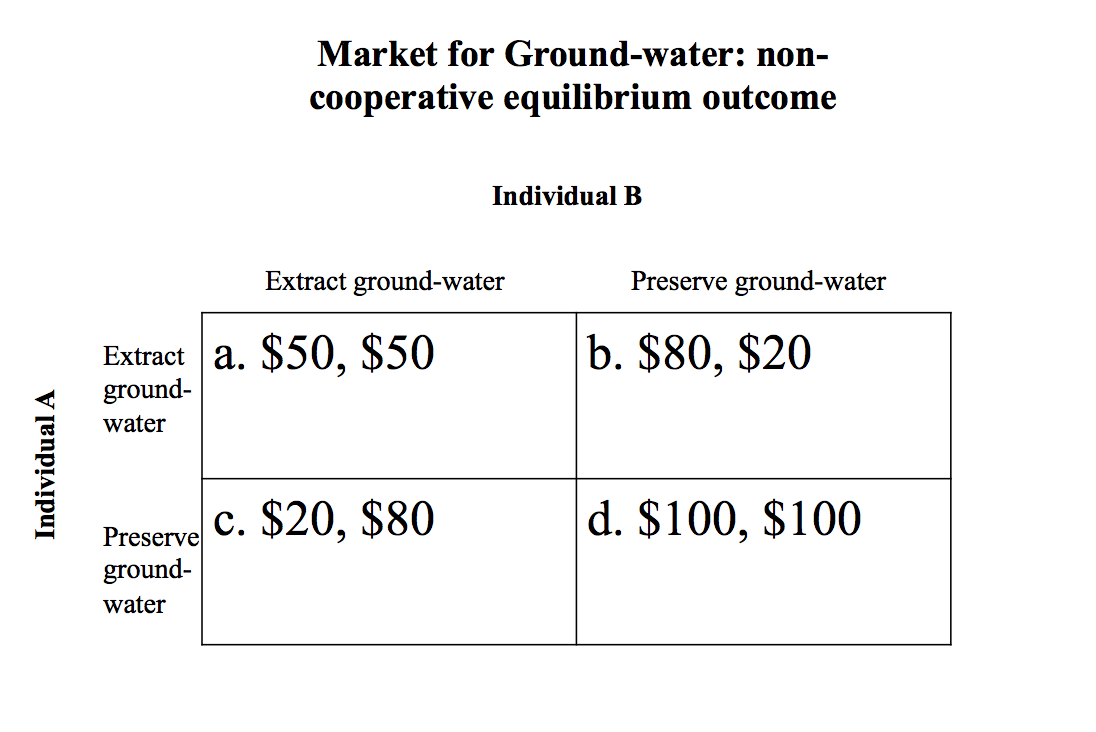
Pay-off matrix for water extraction in CC-PP Game

The CC–PP Game is an example of a non-cooperative equilibrium or Nash Equilibrium in which the parties in the game may not cooperate and are incentivized to deplete natural resources, resulting in an inefficient outcome.

The CC–PP Game refers to the market for a scarce natural resource, for example groundwater. Groundwater is scarce because it can be extracted from the ground at a much higher rate than it can be replenished naturally. In addition, clean groundwater in many areas is limited. Groundwater is a natural resource that can be difficult to assign property rights to and is needed by all individuals.

Private firms as well as everyday consumers will extract groundwater for their own use. Private firms gain profits from using the water to produce a good or directly selling the water. Individual consumers gain utility or satisfaction from drinking the water or using it in their homes. Both the private firm and the individual have an incentive to take water from the ground and receive a gain in utility from taking that water (privatized profits). The water supply is diminished, resulting in a tragedy of the commons and a loss of utility for everyone that uses the groundwater (communized costs). Since an individual user does not have to pay for the cost of water depletion, but is still gaining the utility or profit from using the water, the individual will continue to use the water. Every individual will come to this same conclusion and the natural resource will be depleted.

This can be seen in the pay-off matrix, which is a 2-player Assurance Game or Stag hunt. There are two individuals making separate choices to either: (1) defect by privatizing benefits and commonizing costs; or (2) to cooperate and refrain from personal gain in order to preserve a resource. If Individual A decides to preserve water while Individual B does not then Individual A will only receive $20 while Individual B gains $80. This is true vice versa if Individual B decides to preserve water and Individual A decides to extract. In either case, both individuals have an incentive to defect and extract water to gain $50, so as rational consumers they will extract water. However, if neither party extracted water then they would actually gain $50 more in profit (i.e., $100). This game is similar to a case of the Prisoner's Dilemma except that 'defection' (extracting water) is not a strictly dominant strategy. If a person knows that the other player or player's will 'cooperate' (conserve water), then the rational thing for them to do is to cooperate as well.

As the CC–PP Game is N-Player, outcomes in it are an aggregate of many individuals. This makes it harder to see the effects of a single person's decisions than a 2-person game.

== Real Life Examples ==
=== Fisheries ===
Fisheries are a prime example of the CC–PP Game. Companies gain a profit for every fish that they catch and are incentivized to continue catching fish. However, their overfishing depletes the amount of fish in the ocean, hurting the environment and other individuals. All individuals pay for the cost of a decrease in the amount of fish.

=== Mining ===
Mining companies participate in the CC–PP Game by depleting their worker's health. Hardin argues that the owners of mining companies profit from their workers, while workers suffer the negative health effects of mining such as respiratory damage, chronic lead poisoning, mercury poisoning, black lung disease, and poisoning by radon gas in uranium mines. Hardin states, "Until the development of nationalized schemes of compensation in the twentieth century the costs of deteriorated health were "paid" by the miner himself, partly in medical bills but even more in reduced capacity to work and enjoy life."

=== Intangible Assets ===
Hardin also included "intangible assets" such as “worker safety, stabilizing the cost of healthcare, and economic efficiency" as instances of tragedy of the commons. These assets can also deteriorate if individuals choose to privatize benefits and communize costs.

== Policy Applications ==
Hardin proposed several solutions to the CC–PP Game in his books and essays.

In Hardin's early works, he expressed his belief that the only way to protect natural resources was by limiting individual's freedoms. He stated that preserving the commons would only be possible by “mutual coercion, mutually agreed upon.” Today, this would be considered command and control regulation. Hardin believed that individuals needed regulation or systems in place to force them to stop depleting resources. He rejected the option of people volunteering to not ruin common goods because of individual's lack of will power and lack of incentives to limit themselves. He believed that voluntary self-restraint was not a solution to avoiding the tragedy of the commons.

However, later in his career, Hardin argued that a strict individual responsibility could preserve the commons. He described systems of accountability for policy makers in order to preserve the commons for their constituents. This puts the responsibility for preserving the commons onto the political system.

Ideally Hardin wanted all costs and benefits to be privatized. John D. Aram argues that Hardin would be in favor of a flat tax structure and elimination of public subsidies.

== See also ==
- Common good (economics)
- Common-pool resource
- Externality
- Tragedy of the Commons
- Nash Equilibrium
- Privatize profits and socialize losses
