= Information commons =

An information commons is an information system, such as a physical library or online community, that exists to produce, conserve, and preserve information for current and future generations. Wikipedia could be considered to be an information commons to the extent that it produces and preserves information through current versions of articles and histories. Other examples of an information commons include Creative Commons.

== Introduction ==
The concept of the "information commons" refers to the shared knowledge-base and the processes that facilitate or hinder its use. It also refers to a physical space, usually in an academic library, where any and all can participate in the processes of information research, gathering and production. The term commons refers to the land (or common grounds) that villagers shared for grazing purposes in simpler times. The issues that fall under this topic are varied and include:

- Licenses written to access digital content,
- Copyright law and similar intellectual property,
- Freedom of information,
- International trade,
- Privacy,
- Open-source software,
- Open-access publishing,
- Academic libraries integrated with CIT facilities, particularly in the United States, but including:
  - Information Commons, a learning and study space at the University of Sheffield;
  - Business/SPEA Information Commons, Indiana University, created August 2007.

Some believe that the increasing control and commodification of information restricts humanity's ability to encourage and foster positive developments in its cultural, academic, and economic growth.

== The Internet ==
The internet, and the subsequent internet age, took the information commons to another level by empowering consumers to create and distribute information on a mass scale. The internet facilitated the decentralized production and distribution of information because it bypasses the control of some of more traditional publishing methods. Information published online are neither regulated by managers nor are they coordinated by price signals in the market. This results in a common-based production of knowledge that can be easily shared among individuals.

== Software commons ==
The software commons consists of all computer software which is available to everyone to use for any purpose. It includes licensed open source software which can be used, studied, modified, and redistributed with few, if any, obligations. It also includes software in the public domain that is not technically open source software.

Many innovative programmers have and released open source applications to the public, without the restrictive licensing conditions of commercial software. A popular example is Linux, an open source operating system. The server computers for Google Search run Linux.

=== History ===
Open-source programs started emerging in the 1960s. IBM was one of the first computer companies to offer their products to the public. Most of these computers came with free software that was universal among similar computers, and could be altered by anyone with the software. This changed in the 1970s when IBM decided to take more control of their products, removing the source codes and not allowing the redistribution of their software.

In the 1980s and 1990s the software commons grew with the help of a bulletin board servers, accessed with dial-up modems. This expanded in the late 1990s with the growth of the Internet, which facilitated international cooperation and allowed individuals and groups to share their products more freely. The GNU Project was founded in 1983 to develop free software.

In 1998 Netscape Communications Corporation announced that all future versions of their software would be free of charge and developed by an Open Source Community (Mozilla). This included Netscape Navigator, then the most popular web browser.

== Licensing commons ==
Licensing is the process that copyright owners use to monitor reproduction, distribution, or other use of creative works. Many commercial licensing conditions are costly and restrictive. Licensing models used in information commons typically grant permission for a wide range of uses. The GNU General Public License (GPL), developed by Richard Stallman at MIT in the 1980s is one such license: "The GNU Free Documentation License is a form of copyleft intended for use on a manual, textbook or other document to assure everyone the effective freedom to copy and redistribute it, with or without modifications, either commercially or non-commercially."

== Scholarly commons ==
“In the 1980s, many professional societies turned over their journal publishing to private firms as a way to contain membership fees and generate income.” Prices of scholarly journals rose dramatically and publishing corporations restricted access to these journals through expensive licenses. Research libraries had no other choice but to cut many of their journal subscriptions. European and American academic communities began to find alternate ways to distribute and manage scholarly information. The Scholarly Publishing and Academic Resources Coalition (SPARC) was founded in 1998. “It is an international alliance of academic and research libraries working to correct imbalances in the scholarly publishing system. Its pragmatic focus is to stimulate the emergence of new scholarly communication models that expand the dissemination of scholarly research and reduce financial pressures on libraries."

=== Linking the information commons to learning ===
Many institutions are renovating their libraries to become information commons or learning commons. Frequently, the information commons occupies one floor of a library facility, generally a main service floor, which often includes or replaces the library's reference area. Most information commons are currently in library spaces that have been renovated; a minority are in totally new buildings. A small number of information commons are in non library buildings.

These renovated facilities have become enormously successful, if gate count statistics are used as a measure. At Indiana University, for example, the main library gate count almost doubled from the year prior to the opening of the information commons to the second full year of its existence. Although statistics such as gate counts illustrate the impact of an information commons, there is more to success than just getting students into the library's facilities. St. Thomas University's librarian explained:

I see that one rationale for the Commons is to "get the students to the library." In our case, it has been very effective in attracting students…our gate count was 110 percent higher…so, it will attract students. But … once they are in the building, what do we do with them? How do we engage them? The rationale for the learning commons, in my view, is that, properly designed, implemented, and operated, it will enhance student learning and scholarship. That is the real challenge, and the real goal, of the learning commons.

=== Pervasive technology ===
Information commons have drawn students by offering environments that address their needs, bringing together technology, content, and services in a physical space that results in an environment different from that of a typical library. Traditional libraries offer technology, content, and services, so what is new or different about the information commons? The technology in an information commons is intentionally more pervasive than in most traditional academic libraries. If not already a feature of the library, wireless access is added when the information commons is developed. In addition, increased hardwired Internet connections let students access large files, such as multimedia, or offer an alternative to wireless when the network becomes saturated at peak use times.

=== Group spaces ===
Another major difference between an information commons and traditional libraries is the way in which they accommodate groups. Traditional libraries have focused on providing quiet space for individual study. Occasionally, a few group study rooms are available, but they are considered a peripheral feature of the library. In an information commons, much of the space is configured for use by small groups of students, reflecting students' desire for collaborative learning and combining social interaction with work. Information commons frequently have furniture built to accommodate several people sharing a common computer and provide large tables where several students can use their laptops while working together, comfortable seating areas with upholstered furniture to encourage informal meetings, cafes with food and drink, and group study rooms, often with a computer and screen, so students can work together efficiently on projects.

== See also ==
- Knowledge commons
