= Knowledge commons =

Collectively shared and managed information

The term "knowledge commons" refers to information, data, and content that is collectively owned and managed by a community of users, particularly over the Internet. What distinguishes a knowledge commons from a commons of shared physical resources is that digital resources are non-subtractible; that is, multiple users can access the same digital resources with no effect on their quantity or quality.

== Conceptual background ==
The term 'commons' is derived from the medieval economic system the commons. The knowledge commons is a model for a number of domains, including Open Educational Resources such as the MIT OpenCourseWare, free digital media such as Wikipedia, Creative Commons–licensed art, open-source research, and open scientific collections such as the Public Library of Science or the Science Commons, free software and Open Design. According to research by Charlotte Hess and Elinor Ostrom, the conceptual background of the knowledge commons encompasses two intellectual histories: first, a European tradition of battling the enclosure of the "intangible commons of the mind", threatened by expanding intellectual property rights and privatization of knowledge. Second, a tradition rooted in the United States, which sees the knowledge commons as a shared space allowing for free speech and democratic practices, and which is in the tradition of the town commons movement and commons-based production of scholarly work, open science, open libraries, and collective action.

The production of works in the knowledge commons is often driven by collective intelligence, respectively the wisdom of crowds, and is related to knowledge communism as defined by Robert K. Merton, according to whom scientists give up intellectual property rights in exchange for recognition and esteem.

Ferenc Gyuris argues that it is important to distinguish "information" from "knowledge" in defining the term "knowledge commons". He argues that "knowledge as a shared resource" requires that both information must become accessible and potential recipients must become able and willing to internalize it as 'knowledge'. "Therefore, knowledge cannot become a shared resource without a complex set of institutions and practices that give the opportunity to potential recipients to gain the necessary abilities and willingness".

== Copyleft ==
Copyleft licenses are institutions which support a knowledge commons of executable software. Copyleft licenses grant licensees all necessary rights such as right to study, use, change and redistribute—under the condition that all future works building on the license are again kept in the commons. Popular applications of the 'copyleft' principle are the GNU Software Licenses (GPL, LGPL and GFDL by Free Software Foundation) and the share-alike licenses under creative commons.

== See also ==
- Commons-based peer production
- Digital commons (economics)
- Information commons
- Open content
- Open Knowledge Foundation
- Open source
- Open source appropriate technology
- Open-design movement
- Public ownership
