= William Forster Lloyd =

English economic writer (1794–1852)

William Forster Lloyd FRS
- Born: 1794; Bradenham, Buckinghamshire, England
- Died: 2 June 1852 (aged 57–58); Prestwood, Missenden, Buckinghamshire, England
- Education: Westminster School
- Alma mater: Christ Church, Oxford
- Occupation: Economist
- Parent(s): Thomas Lloyd (father); Elizabeth Ryder (mother)

William Forster Lloyd FRS (1794 – 2 June 1852) was an English writer on economics. He is best known today for one of his 1833 lectures on population control which have influenced writers in modern economic theory.

== Life ==
Born in 1794 at Bradenham, Buckinghamshire, he was the fourth son of Thomas Lloyd, rector of Aston-sub-Edge, and his wife, Elizabeth Ryder; Charles Lloyd was his elder brother. He was educated at Westminster School and Christ Church, Oxford, graduating BA in 1815 and MA in 1818. He was Greek Reader in 1823, Mathematical lecturer and Drummond Professor of Political Economy (1832–1837) at Christ Church, Oxford (successor to Nassau Senior). He was elected a Fellow of the Royal Society in 1834, and died at Prestwood, Missenden, Buckinghamshire in 1852.

== Influential lectures ==
Lloyd published several of his lectures. In his Two Lectures on the Checks to Population (1833) he introduced the concept of the overuse of a common by its commoners (i.e. those with rights of use and access to it), which was later to be developed by the economist H. Scott Gordon and later still by the ecologist and eugenicist Garrett Hardin and termed by Hardin "The Tragedy of the Commons". However, Hardin's use of Lloyd's example has frequently been misunderstood, leading him to later remark that he should have titled his work "The Tragedy of the Unmanaged Commons".

The key passage in Lloyd's work is:

"If a person puts more cattle into his own field, the amount of the subsistence which they consume is all deducted from that which was at the command, of his original stock; and if, before, there was no more than a sufficiency of pasture, he reaps no benefit from the additional cattle, what is gained in one way being lost in another. But if he puts more cattle on a common, the food which they consume forms a deduction which is shared between all the cattle, as well that of others as his own, in proportion to their number, and only a small part of it is taken from his own cattle. In an inclosed pasture, there is a point of saturation, if I may so call it, (by which, I mean a barrier depending on considerations of interest,) beyond which no prudent man will add to his stock. In a common, also, there is in like manner a point of saturation. But the position of the point in the two cases is obviously different. Were a number of adjoining pastures, already fully stocked, to be at once thrown open, and converted into one vast common, the position of the point of saturation would immediately be changed".

In his Lectures on Population, Value, Poor Laws and Rent (1837) he introduced a concise and complete statement of the concept of diminishing marginal utility, and connected demand to value, but he presents neither derivation nor elaboration. Still this contribution places him clearly in the ranks of the Oxford-Dublin school of proto-Marginalists.

== Major works of William F. Lloyd ==
- Lecture on the Notion of Value, as Distinguished Not Only from Utility, but also from Value in Exchange. London; Oxford and Cambridge: Roake and Varty; J. H. Parker; J & J. J. Deighton. 1834 – via Internet Archive.
- Two Lectures on the Checks to Population, 1833.
- Four Lectures on Poor-Laws, 1835
- Two Lectures on the Justice of the Poor-Laws and One Lecture on Rent, 1837.
- Lectures on Population, Value, Poor Laws and Rent, 1837.
