= Joachim Radkau =

German historian (born 1943)

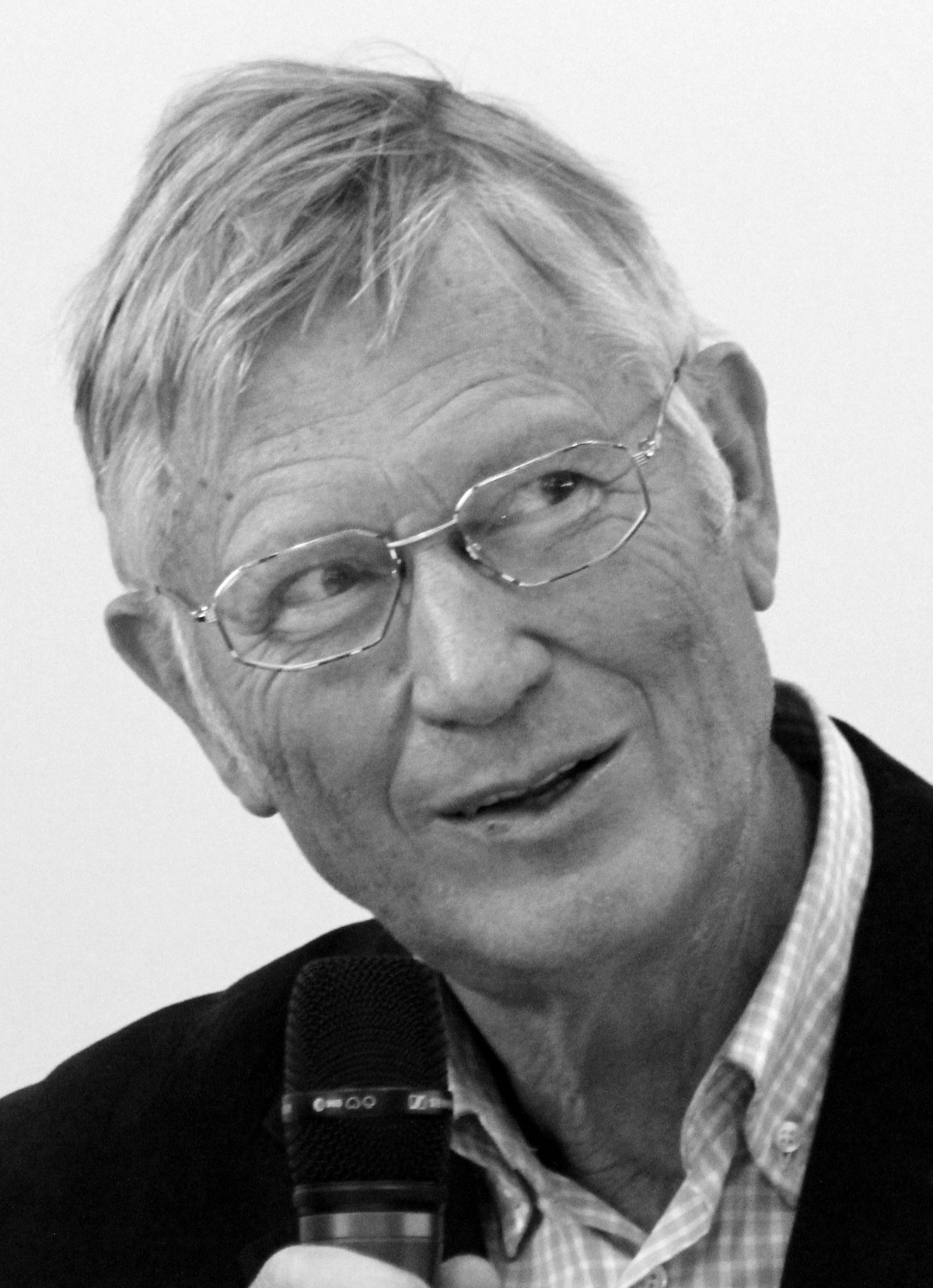
- Joachim Radkau, Frankfurt Book Fair 2013
- Born: October 4, 1943 (age 83)

Joachim Radkau (born October 4, 1943) is a German historian.

== Life ==
Radkau was born in Oberlübbe, now Hille, Landkreis Minden. Son of a Protestant priest, he studied history in Münster, Berlin (Freie Universität) and Hamburg from 1963 to 1968. He was influenced e.g. by Fritz Fischer. His doctorate, which he earned in 1970, treated the role of German immigrants 1933-45 on Franklin D. Roosevelt. From 1971 on he started to teach at Bielefeld University.

1972 till 1974 Radkau wrote together with George W. F. Hallgarten a synopsis of German industry and politics. His views about the role of Hermann Josef Abs in German negotiations with Israel led to legal claim of Deutsche Bank.

In 1980 Radkau received the venia legendi for his study of the rise and crisis of the German nuclear industry. History of technology and Environmental history are favorite topics of Radkau. Besides forestry and the role of environmental protection in the German history, including the Third Reich, Radkau researched as well the relation between Nervosität (Anxiety) and technical development in the German Empire, adding biographical studies about Thomas Mann and Max Weber.

== Awards and honors ==
- 2009: World History Association Book Prize, Nature and Power

== Bibliography ==
- Die deutsche Emigration in den USA. Ihr Einfluß auf die amerikanische Europapolitik 1933-1945. Düsseldorf 1971, ISBN 3-571-09190-6
- Zus. mit George W. F. Hallgarten: Deutsche Industrie und Politik von Bismarck bis heute. Frankfurt/Köln 1974, ISBN 3-499-17450-2
- Zus. mit Imanuel Geiss (Hrsg.): Imperialismus im 20. Jahrhundert. Gedenkschrift für George W. F. Hallgarten. München 1976, ISBN 3-406-06464-7
- Aufstieg und Krise der deutschen Atomwirtschaft 1945-1975. Verdrängte Alternativen in der Kerntechnik und der Ursprung der nuklearen Kontroverse. Reinbek 1983, ISBN 3-499-17756-0
- Zus. mit Ingrid Schäfer: Holz - Ein Naturstoff in der Technikgeschichte. Reinbek 1987, ISBN 3-499-17728-5
- Technik in Deutschland. Vom 18. Jahrhundert bis zur Gegenwart. Frankfurt/M. 1989, ISBN 3-518-11536-7
- Das Zeitalter der Nervosität. Deutschland zwischen Bismarck und Hitler. München 1998, ISBN 3-446-19310-3
- Natur und Macht. Eine Weltgeschichte der Umwelt. München 2000, ISBN 3-406-48655-X
- Nature and Power: A Global History of the Environment. By Joachim Radkau. Publications of the German Historical Institute Series. New York: Cambridge University Press, 2008
- Mensch und Natur in der Geschichte. Leipzig 2002 (Politische Weltkunde, Arbeitsbuch für die Sekundarstufe II)
- "Exceptionalism in European environmental history". Bulletin of the German Historical Institute. 33: 23–44. Fall 2003.
- Max Weber. Die Leidenschaft des Denkens. München 2005, ISBN 3-446-20675-2
- Aufstieg und Fall der deutschen Atomwirtschaft, with Lothar Hahn (2013).
