= Boiling frog =

Metaphor about slow change

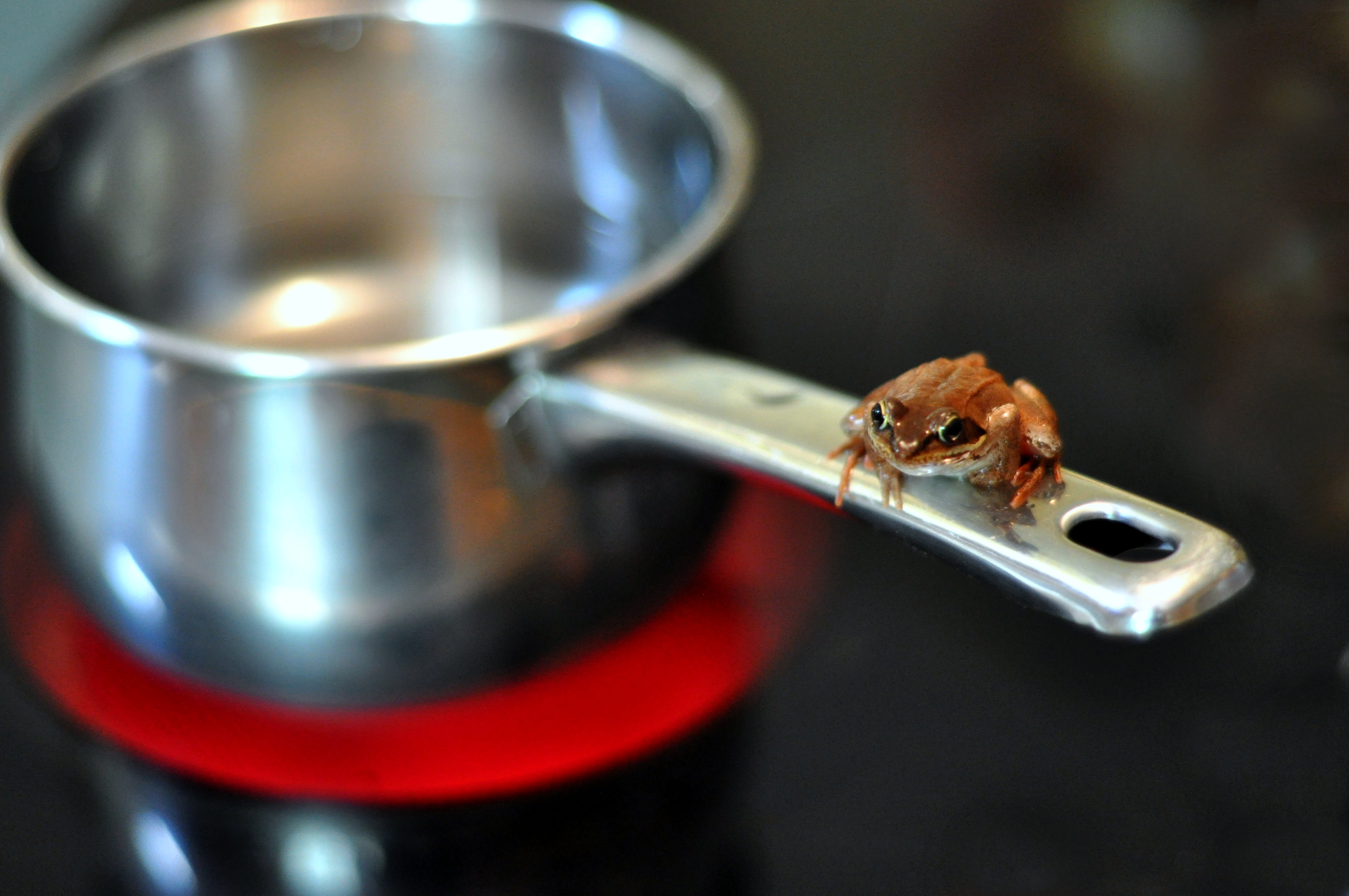
A frog sitting on the handle of a saucepan on a hot stove

The boiling frog is an apologue describing a frog being slowly boiled alive. The premise is that if a frog is put suddenly into boiling water, it will jump out, but if the frog is put in tepid water which is then brought to a boil slowly, it will not perceive the danger and will be cooked to death. The story is often used as a metaphor for the inability or unwillingness of people to react to or be aware of sinister threats that arise gradually rather than suddenly.

Some 19th-century experiments, especially Fratscher's experiments in 1875, suggested that the underlying premise is true if the heating is sufficiently gradual, but according to some modern biologists, the premise is false. They note that changing location is a natural thermoregulation strategy for frogs and other ectotherms, and is necessary for survival in the wild, so a frog that is gradually heated will jump out. Furthermore, a frog placed into already boiling water will die immediately, not jump out.

== As metaphor ==
If you drop a frog in a pot of boiling water, it will of course frantically try to clamber out. But if you place it gently in a pot of tepid water and turn the heat on low, it will float there quite placidly. As the water gradually heats up, the frog will sink into a tranquil stupor, exactly like one of us in a hot bath, and before long, with a smile on its face, it will unresistingly allow itself to be boiled to death.

— Version of the story from Daniel Quinn's 1996 novel The Story of B

The boiling frog story is generally offered as a metaphor cautioning people to be aware of even gradual change lest they suffer eventual undesirable consequences. It may be invoked in support of a slippery slope argument as a caution against creeping normality. It is also used in business to reinforce that change needs to be gradual to be accepted. The term "boiling frog syndrome" is a metaphor used to describe the failure to act against a problematic situation which will increase in severity until reaching catastrophic proportions. It thereby encapsulates the barely noticeable impact of slow environmental degradation that has been described by Daniel Pauly as shifting baselines.

The story has been retold many times and used to illustrate widely varying viewpoints: in 1960 about warning against those who wished for detente during the Cold War; in 1980 about the impending collapse of civilization anticipated by survivalists; in the 1990s about inaction in response to climate change and staying in abusive relationships. It has also been used by libertarians to warn about the slow erosion of civil liberties.

In the 1996 novel The Story of B, environmentalist author Daniel Quinn spends a chapter on the metaphor of the boiling frog, using it to describe human history, population growth and food surplus. Pierce Brosnan's character Harry Dalton mentioned it in the 1997 disaster movie Dante's Peak in reference to the accumulating warning signs of the volcano's reawakening. Al Gore used a version of the story in a New York Times op-ed, in his presentations and the 2006 movie An Inconvenient Truth to describe ignorance about global warming. In the movie version the frog is rescued before it is harmed. This use of the story was referenced by writer/director Jon Cooksey in the title of his 2010 comedic documentary How to Boil a Frog.

Law professor and legal commentator Eugene Volokh commented in 2003 that regardless of the behavior of real frogs, the boiling frog story is useful as a metaphor, comparing it to the metaphor of an ostrich with its head in the sand. Economics Nobel laureate and New York Times op-ed writer Paul Krugman used the story as a metaphor in a July 2009 column, while pointing out that real frogs behave differently. Journalist James Fallows has been advocating since 2006 for people to stop retelling the story, describing it as a "stupid canard" and a "myth". After Krugman's column appeared, however, he declared "peace on the boiled frog front" and said that using the story is acceptable if the writer points out that it is not literally true.

== In philosophy ==
In philosophy, the boiling frog story has been used as a way of explaining the sorites paradox. It describes a hypothetical heap of sand from which individual grains are removed one at a time, and asks if there is a specific point when it can no longer be defined as a heap.

== Experiments and analysis ==
=== Initial experiments ===
During the 19th century, several experiments were performed to observe the reaction of frogs to slowly heated water. In 1869, while doing experiments searching for the location of the soul, German physiologist Friedrich Goltz demonstrated that a frog that has had its brain removed will remain in slowly heated water, but an intact frog attempted to escape the water when it reached 25 °C.

Other 19th-century experiments were purported to show that frogs did not attempt to escape gradually heated water. An 1872 experiment by Heinzmann was said to show that a normal frog would not attempt to escape if the water was heated slowly enough, which was corroborated in 1875 by German scientist Carl Fratscher.

In 1888, William Thompson Sedgwick said that the apparent contradiction between the results of these experiments was a consequence of different heating rates used in the experiments: "The truth appears to be that if the heating be sufficiently gradual, no reflex movements will be produced even in the normal frog; if it be more rapid, yet take place at such a rate as to be fairly called 'gradual', it will not secure the response of the normal frog under any circumstances". Goltz had raised the temperature of the water from 17.5 °C to 56 °C in about ten minutes, or 3.8 °C per minute, in his experiment, whereas Heinzmann heated the frogs over the course of 90 minutes from about 21 °C to 37.5 °C, a rate of less than 0.2 °C per minute.

The heating rate was even slower in some of Fratscher's experiments in 1875. He described two experiments (nos. 36 and 37) in which an unharmed frog, two-thirds submerged, remained in a water that was heated up by approximately 0.002°C per second, and eventually stopped breathing after some time, with the temperature being raised from 20°C to 38°C in 2 hours and 16 minutes in the first case and from 20.3°C to 36.5°C in 2 hours and 19 minutes in the second case. Conversely, in an additional experiment (no. 38), where the temperature was raised from 21°C to 25°C in 31 minutes and then from 26°C to 29°C in 5 minutes with an enlarged flame, the frog became very agitated in the second phase and tried to escape.

Edward Wheeler Scripture summarized this in The New Psychology (1897): "a live frog can actually be boiled without a movement if the water is heated slowly enough; in one experiment the temperature was raised at a rate of 0.002°C per second, and the frog was found dead at the end of 2½ hours without having moved."

=== Modern controversy and analysis ===
Modern scientific sources report that the alleged phenomenon is not real. In 1995, Douglas Melton, a biologist at Harvard University, said, "If you put a frog in boiling water, it won't jump out. It will die. If you put it in cold water, it will jump before it gets hot—they don't sit still for you." George R. Zug, curator of reptiles and amphibians at the National Museum of Natural History, also rejected the suggestion, saying that "If a frog had a means of getting out, it certainly would get out." In 2002, Victor H. Hutchison, a retired zoologist at the University of Oklahoma with a research interest in thermal relations of amphibians, said that "The legend is entirely incorrect!" He described how a critical thermal maximum for many frog species has been determined by contemporary research experiments: as the water is heated by about 2 °F (about 1 °C), per minute, the frog becomes increasingly active as it tries to escape, and eventually jumps out if it can.

In 2018, researchers Agustín Camacho, Caroline Molina and Fernando Ribeiro, from the Department of Physiology of São Paulo's Biosciences Institute, made a similar test using Bullfrogs (Rana catesbeiana) although not in water but in a dry container. They found that the 15 normally hydrated frogs all exited the container, at an average body temperature of 35.9 °C (called "voluntary thermal maximum") which did not depend on the heating rate (which ranged 0.17–0.87 °C/min i.e. 0.003-0.015 °C/s – so all of these heating rates were faster than Fratscher's 0.002 °C/s in 1875). However 8 out of 15 severely dehydrated frogs did not exit and died. A previous study with different lizard species showed that the effect of heating rate may be species specific, with active thermoregulator lizards being unaffected by it and thermoconformer lizards being affected. A later study on gardener ants showed slower heating rates made individuals exit the heating chambers at lower temperatures, as it did for the thermoconformer lizard.

== See also ==
- Normalization of deviance
- Alarm fatigue
- Camel's nose, a story with similar meaning
- Overton window
- Salami tactics
- First they came ...
- Foot-in-the-door technique
- Gaslighting
- Frogs in popular culture
- Scorpion and the frog
- Tyranny of small decisions

== Cited references ==
- Sedgwick, William (July 1888). "On the variation of reflex excitability in the frog induced by changes of temperature". Studies from the Biological Laboratory of the Johns Hopkins University. 2. Baltimore, Maryland: N. Murray, Johns Hopkins University: 385–410.
