= Slippery slope =

Rhetorical argument

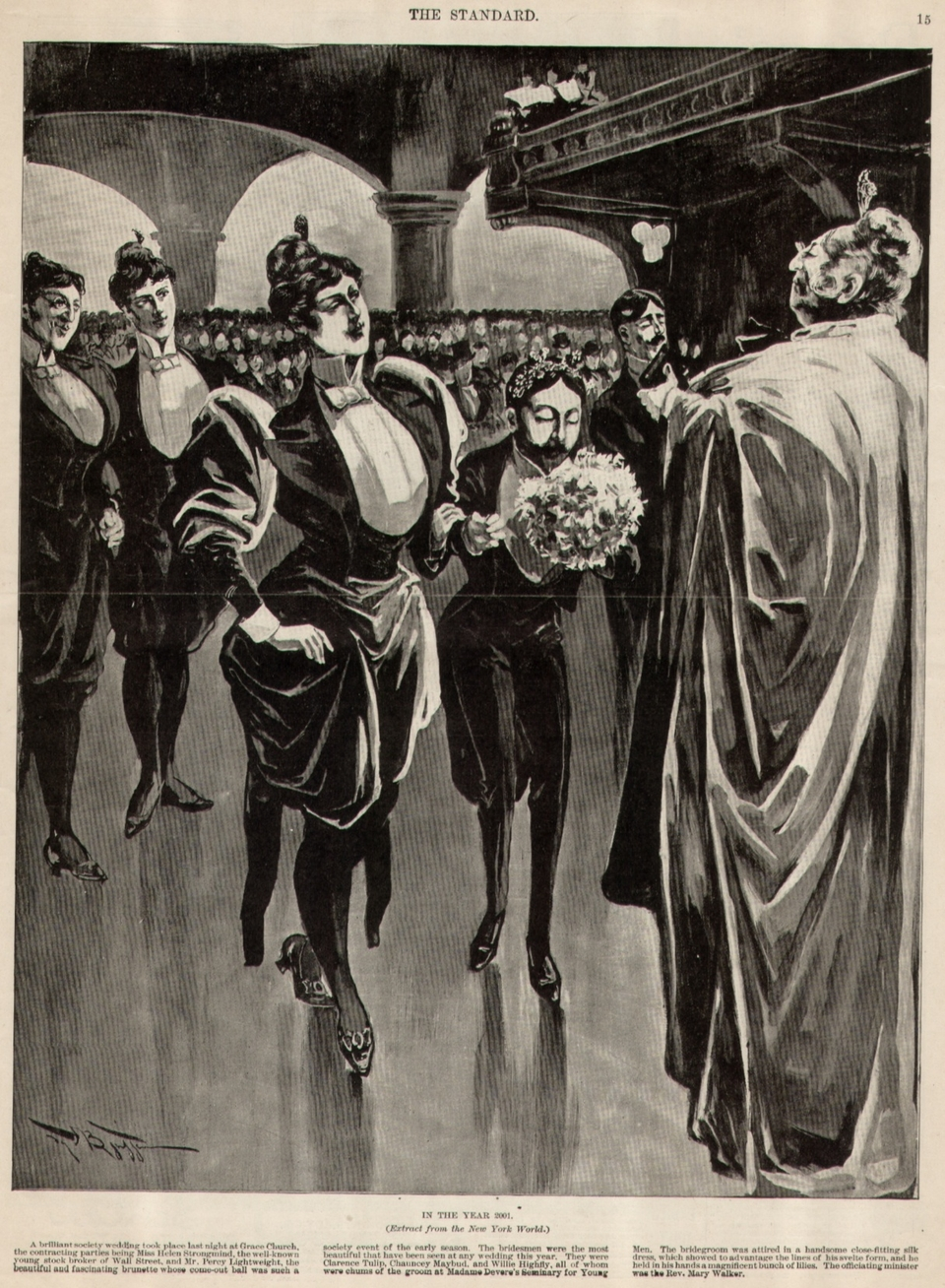
This 1895 cartoon makes a slippery-slope argument of how weddings would look in 2001 if women got the right to vote.

In a slippery-slope argument, a course of action is rejected because the slippery slope advocate believes it will lead to a chain reaction resulting in an undesirable end or ends. The core of the slippery slope argument is that a specific decision under debate is likely to result in unintended consequences. The strength of such an argument depends on whether the small step really is likely to lead to the effect. This is quantified in terms of what is known as the warrant (in this case, a demonstration of the process that leads to the significant effect).

This type of argument is sometimes used as a form of fearmongering in which the probable consequences of a given action are exaggerated in an attempt to scare the audience. When the initial step is not demonstrably likely to result in the claimed effects, this is called the slippery-slope fallacy. This is a type of informal fallacy, and is a subset of continuum fallacy, in that it ignores the possibility of middle ground and assumes a discrete transition from category A to category B. Other idioms for the slippery slope fallacy are the thin edge of the wedge, domino fallacy (as a form of domino effect argument) or dam burst, and various other terms that are sometimes considered distinct argument types or reasoning flaws, such as the camel's nose in the tent, parade of horribles, boiling frog, and snowball effect.

== Slopes, arguments, and fallacies ==
Some writers distinguish between a slippery slope event and a slippery slope argument. A slippery slope event can be represented by a series of conditional statements, namely:

If p then q; if q then r; if r then ... z.

The idea being that through a series of intermediate steps, p will imply z. Some writers point out that strict necessity isn't required and it can still be characterized as a slippery slope if at each stage the next step is plausible. With strict implication, p will imply z, but if at each step the probability is 90%, for example, then the more steps there are, the less likely it becomes that p will cause z.

A slippery slope argument is typically a negative argument where there is an attempt to discourage someone from taking a course of action because if they do it will lead to some unacceptable conclusion. Some writers point out that an argument with the same structure might be used in a positive way in which someone is encouraged to take the first step because it leads to a desirable conclusion.

If someone is accused of using a slippery slope argument then it is being suggested they are guilty of fallacious reasoning, and while they are claiming that p implies z, for whatever reason, this is not the case. In logic and critical thinking textbooks, slippery slopes and slippery slope arguments are normally discussed as a form of fallacy, although there may be an acknowledgement that non-fallacious forms of the argument can also exist.

== Types of argument ==
Different writers have classified slippery slope arguments in different and often contradictory ways, but there are two basic types of argument that have been described as slippery slope arguments. One type has been called the causal slippery slope, and the distinguishing feature of this type is that the various steps leading from p to z are events with each event being the cause of the next in the sequence. The second type might be called the judgmental slippery slope with the idea being that the 'slope' does not consist of a series of events but is such that, for whatever reason, if a person makes one particular judgment they will rationally have to make another and so on. The judgmental type may be further sub-divided into conceptual slippery slopes and decisional slippery slopes.

Conceptual slippery slopes, which Trudy Govier calls the fallacy of slippery assimilation, are closely related to the sorites paradox. In the context of talking about slippery slopes, Merilee Salmon writes: "The slippery slope is an ancient form of reasoning. According to Bas van Fraassen (The Scientific Image), the argument is found in Sextus Empiricus that incest is not immoral, on the grounds that 'touching your mother's big toe with your little finger is not immoral, and all the rest differs only by degree.'"

Decisional slippery slopes are similar to conceptual slippery slopes in that they rely on there being a continuum with no clear dividing lines such that if you decide to accept one position or course of action then there will, either now or in the future, be no rational grounds for not accepting the next position or course of action in the sequence.

The difficulty in classifying slippery slope arguments is that there is no clear consensus in the literature as to how terminology should be used. It has been said that whilst these two fallacies "have a relationship which may justify treating them together", they are also distinct, and "the fact that they share a name is unfortunate". Some writers treat them side by side but emphasize how they differ. Some writers use the term slippery slope to refer to one kind of argument but not the other, but don't agree on which one, whilst others use the term to refer to both. For example:

- Christopher Tindale gives a definition that only fits the causal type. He says: "Slippery Slope reasoning is a type of negative reasoning from consequences, distinguished by the presence of a causal chain leading from the proposed action to the negative outcome."
- Merrilee Salmon describes the fallacy as a failure to recognise that meaningful distinctions can be drawn and even casts the "domino theory" in that light.
- Douglas N. Walton says that an essential feature of slippery slopes is a "loss of control" and this only fits with the decisional type of slippery slope. He says that, "The domino argument has a sequence of events in which each one in the sequence causes the next one to happen in such a manner that once the first event occurs it will lead to the next event, and so forth, until the last event in the sequence finally occurs…(and)…is clearly different from the slippery slope argument, but can be seen as a part of it, and closely related to it."

== Metaphor and its alternatives ==
The metaphor of the "slippery slope" dates back at least to Cicero's essay Laelius de Amicitia (XII.41). The title character Gaius Laelius Sapiens uses the metaphor to describe the decline of the Republic upon the impending election of Gaius Gracchus: "Affairs soon move on, for they glide readily down the path of ruin when once they have taken a start."

=== Thin end of a wedge ===
Walton suggests Alfred Sidgwick should be credited as the first writer on informal logic to describe what would today be called a slippery slope argument. Sidgwick wrote in 1910:

We must not do this or that, it is often said, because if we did we should be logically bound to do something else which is plainly absurd or wrong. If we once begin to take a certain course there is no knowing where we shall be able to stop within any show of consistency; there would be no reason for stopping anywhere in particular, and we should be led on, step by step into action or opinions that we all agree to call undesirable or untrue.

Sidgwick says this is "popularly known as the objection to a thin end of a wedge" but might be classified now as a decisional slippery slope. However, the wedge metaphor also captures the idea that unpleasant end result is a wider application of a principle associated with the initial decision which is often a feature of decisional slippery slopes due to their incremental nature but may be absent from causal slippery slopes.

=== Domino fallacy ===
T. Edward Damer, in his book Attacking Faulty Reasoning, describes what others might call a causal slippery slope but says:

While this image may be insightful for understanding the character of the fallacy, it represents a misunderstanding of the nature of the causal relations between events. Every causal claim requires a separate argument. Hence, any "slipping" to be found is only in the clumsy thinking of the arguer, who has failed to provide sufficient evidence that one causally explained event can serve as an explanation for another event or for a series of events.

Instead Damer prefers to call it the domino fallacy. Howard Kahane suggests that the domino variation of the fallacy has gone out of fashion because it was tied to the domino theory for the United States becoming involved in the war in Vietnam and although the U.S. lost that war, "it is primarily communist dominoes that have fallen."

=== Dam burst ===
Frank Saliger notes that "in the German-speaking world the dramatic image of the dam burst seems to predominate, in English speaking circles talk is more of the slippery slope argument", and that "in German writing dam burst and slippery slope arguments are treated as broadly synonymous. In particular the structural analyses of slippery slope arguments derived from English writing are largely transferred directly to the dam burst argument."

In exploring the differences between the two metaphors, he comments that in the dam burst the initial action is clearly in the foreground and there is a rapid movement towards the resulting events whereas in the slippery slope metaphor the downward slide has at least equal prominence to the initial action and it "conveys the impression of a slower 'step-by-step' process where the decision maker as participant slides inexorably downwards under the weight of its own successive (erroneous) decisions". Despite these differences Saliger continues to treat the two metaphors as being synonymous. Walton argues that although the two are comparable "the metaphor of the dam bursting carries with it no essential element of a sequence of steps from an initial action through a gray zone with its accompanying loss of control eventuated in the ultimate outcome of the ruinous disaster. For these reasons, it seems best to propose drawing a distinction between dam burst arguments and slippery slope arguments."

=== Other metaphors ===
Eric Lode notes that:

"Commentators have used numerous different metaphors to refer to arguments that have this rough form. For example, people have called such arguments "wedge" or "thin edge of the wedge", "camel's nose" or "camel's nose in the tent", "parade of horrors" or "parade of horribles", "domino", "boiling frog" and "this could snowball" arguments. All of these metaphors suggest that allowing one practice or policy could lead us to allow a series of other practices or policies."

Bruce Waller says it is lawyers who often call it the "parade of horribles" argument while politicians seem to favor "the camel's nose is in the tent".

The 1985 best-selling children's book If You Give a Mouse a Cookie by Laura Joffe Numeroff and Felicia Bond popularized the general idea of the slippery slope for recent generations.

== Defining features of slippery slope arguments ==
Given the disagreement over what constitutes a genuine slippery slope argument, it is to be expected that there are differences in the way they are defined. Lode says that "although all SSAs share certain features, they are a family of related arguments rather than a class of arguments whose members all share the same form."

Various writers have attempted to produce a general taxonomy of these different kinds of slippery slope. Other writers have given a general definition that will encompass the diversity of slippery slope arguments. Eugene Volokh says, "I think the most useful definition of a slippery slope is one that covers all situations where decision A, which you might find appealing, ends up materially increasing the probability that others will bring about decision B, which you oppose."

Those who hold that slippery slopes are causal generally give a simple definition, provide some appropriate examples and perhaps add some discussion as to the difficulty of determining whether the argument is reasonable or fallacious. Most of the more detailed analysis of slippery slopes has been done by those who hold that genuine slippery slopes are of the decisional kind.

Lode, having claimed that SSAs are not a single class of arguments whose members all share the same form, nevertheless goes on to suggest the following common features.

1. The series of intervening and gradual steps
2. The idea that the slope lacks a non-arbitrary stopping place
3. The idea that the practice under consideration is, in itself, unobjectionable

Rizzo and Whitman identify slightly different features. They say, "Although there is no paradigm case of the slippery slope argument, there are characteristic features of all such arguments. The key components of slippery slope arguments are three:

1. An initial, seemingly acceptable argument and decision;
2. A "danger case"—a later argument and decision that are clearly unacceptable;
3. A "process" or "mechanism" by which accepting the initial argument and making the initial decision raise the likelihood of accepting the later argument and making the later decision."

Walton notes that these three features will be common to all slippery slopes but objects that there needs to be more clarity on the nature of the 'mechanism' and a way of distinguishing between slippery slope arguments and arguments from negative consequences.

Corner et al. say that a slippery slope has "four distinct components":

1. An initial proposal (A).
2. An undesirable outcome (C).
3. The belief that allowing (A) will lead to a re-evaluation of (C) in the future.
4. The rejection of (A) based on this belief.

The alleged danger lurking on the slippery slope is the fear that a presently unacceptable proposal (C) will (by any number of psychological processes—see, e.g., Volokh 2003) in the future be re-evaluated as acceptable."

Walton adds the requirement that there must be a loss of control. He says, there are four basic components:

One is a first step, an action or policy being considered. A second is a sequence in which this action leads to other actions. A third is a so-called gray zone or area of indeterminacy along the sequence where the agent loses control. The fourth is the catastrophic outcome at the very end of the sequence. The idea is that as soon as the agent in question takes the first step he will be impelled forward through the sequence, losing control so that in the end he will reach the catastrophic outcome. Not all of these components are typically made explicit ...."

== See also ==
- Appeal to probability
- Boiling frog
- Broccoli mandate
- Broken windows theory
- Butterfly effect
- Creeping normality
- Euthanasia and the slippery slope
- First they came ...
- Foot-in-the-door technique
- Gateway drug theory
- Normalization of deviance
- Overton window
- Precautionary principle
- Precedent
- Reductio ad absurdum
- Salami slicing tactics
- Shifting baseline
- Snowball effect
- Splitting (psychology)
- Trivial objections
