= Creeping normality =

Process by which a change can be accepted through happening slowly

Creeping normality (also called gradualism, or landscape amnesia) is a process by which a major change can be accepted as normal and acceptable if it happens gradually through small, often unnoticeable, increments of change. The change could otherwise be regarded as remarkable and objectionable if it took hold suddenly or in a short time span.

American scientist Jared Diamond used creeping normality in his 2005 book Collapse: How Societies Choose to Fail or Succeed. Prior to releasing his book, Diamond explored this theory while attempting to explain why, in the course of long-term environmental degradation, Easter Island natives would, seemingly irrationally, chop down the last tree:

I suspect, though, that the disaster happened not with a bang but with a whimper. After all, there are those hundreds of abandoned statues to consider. The forest the islanders depended on for rollers and rope didn't simply disappear one day—it vanished slowly, over decades.

== See also ==
- Boiling frog
- Camel's nose
- "First they came ... "
- Habituation
- If You Give a Mouse a Cookie
- Lingchi – "Death by a thousand cuts"
- Moving the goalposts
- Normalization of antisemitism
- Normalisation of deviance
- Overton window
- Principiis obsta (et respice finem) – 'resist the beginnings (and consider the end)'
- Salami slicing tactics
- Settler colonialism
- Shifting baseline
- Slippery slope
- Technological change as a social process
- Tyranny of small decisions
