= Parade of horribles =

Rhetorical device or literal parade with grotesque costumes

A parade of horribles can either refer to a type of parade where people wear grotesque costumes, or a rhetorical device where one argues against taking a certain course of action by listing a number of extremely undesirable events that would result from it.

== As a literal parade ==
The phrase parade of horribles originally referred to a literal parade of people wearing comic and grotesque costumes, rather like the Philadelphia Mummers Parade. It was a traditional feature of Fourth of July parades in parts of the United States in the 19th century, and "Horribles Parades" continue to be part of the Independence Day celebration in several New England in communities like Gloucester, Massachusetts. A 1926 newspaper article about July the Fourth celebrations in the White Mountains of New Hampshire notes:

Old-time celebrations are to be held tomorrow at Littleton, Lancaster, Colebrook, and Conway, with all the usual features of street parades of horribles and grotesques, brass bands, decorated automobiles and vehicles, exhibitions by fire departments, basket picnics in convenient groves...

Founded in 1926, the Ancient and Horribles Parade in Chepachet, Rhode Island continues this tradition.

Other rural New England towns, such as Hopkinton, Massachusetts, and Mendon, Massachusetts, still hold annual Horribles Parades.

== As a rhetorical device ==
A parade of horribles is also a rhetorical device whereby the speaker argues against taking a certain course of action by listing a number of extremely undesirable events which will ostensibly result from the action. Its power lies in the emotional impact of the unpleasant predictions; however, a parade of horribles can potentially be a fallacy if one or more of the following is true:

- The action doesn't actually change the likelihood of the "horribles" occurring. The "horribles" could be unlikely to occur even if the action is taken, or they could be likely to happen anyway even if the action is avoided. This is an appeal to probability, and can be viewed as a non sequitur insofar as the action has no causal relation to the "horribles".
- The argument relies solely on the emotional impact of the "horribles" (an appeal to emotion).
- The "horribles" are not actually bad.
- The "horribles" have a low probability of occurring when compared to the high probability of good occurring.

A parade of horribles may be a type of hyperbole if it exaggerates the negative results of the action.

=== Examples ===
- In National Federation of Independent Business v. Sebelius, 567 U.S. 519 (2012), Chief Justice John Roberts held that the Affordable Care Act lacked justification under the Commerce Clause, noting that, if Congress could force people to purchase health insurance to prevent them from burdening the health care system in the future, then Congress could also force people to buy vegetables because eating meat is less healthy and could cause people to likewise burden the health care system. Justice Ruth Bader Ginsburg responded by criticizing Chief Justice Roberts' argument as the "broccoli horrible".

== See also ==
- Misleading vividness
- Ancient and Horribles Parade
- Slippery slope
