= Camel's nose =

Metaphor indicating undesireable results

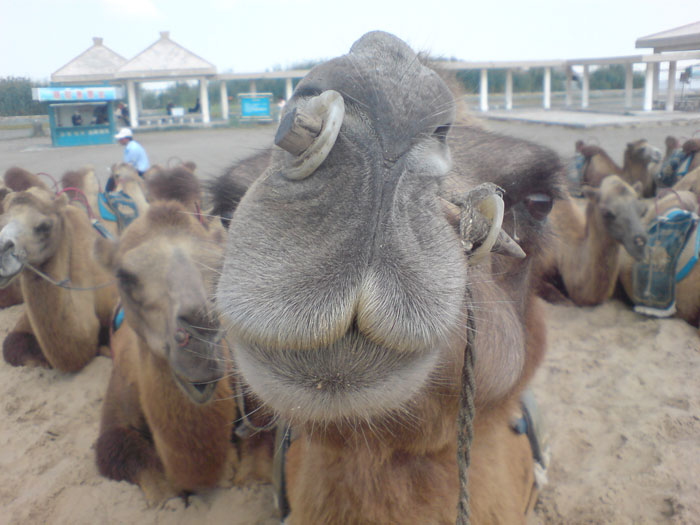
The nose of a camel

The camel's nose is a metaphor for small and seemingly insignificant actions which cause increasingly large and undesirable events to occur. It is comparable to the English idioms slippery slope and foot in the door.

== History ==
According to Geoffrey Nunberg, the image entered the English language in the middle of the 19th century. An early example is a fable printed in 1858 in which an Arab miller allows a camel to stick its nose into his bedroom, then other parts of its body, until the camel is entirely inside and refuses to leave. Lydia Sigourney wrote another version, a widely reprinted poem for children, in which the camel enters a shop because the workman does not forbid it at any stage.

The 1858 example above says, "The Arabs repeat a fable", and Sigourney says in a footnote, "To illustrate the danger of the first approach of evil habit, the Arabs have a proverb, 'Beware of the camel's nose.'" Nunberg could not find an Arab source for the saying, however, and suspected it was a Victorian invention.

An early citation with a tent is "The camel in the Arabian tale begged and received permission to insert his nose into the desert tent." By 1878, the expression was familiar enough that part of the story could be left unstated. "It is the humble petition of the camel, who only asks that he may put his nose into the traveler's tent. It is so pitiful, so modest, that we must needs relent and grant it."

A 1909 essay by John B. West, founder of the West legal classification system, used the metaphor to describe the difficulty of trying to insert an otherwise innocuous set of facts into a rigid legal system:

three excellent digesters [] spent an entire day in disagreeing as to whether seal fishery cases should be classified under the topic 'Fish' or that of 'Game' .... It is the old story of the camel's head in the tent. What seems at first a plausible pretext for forcing some novel case or new principle into a topic or subdivision to which it does not naturally belong, leads to hopeless confusion.

In a 1915 book of fables by Horace Scudder, the story titled The Arab and His Camel ends with the moral: "It is a wise rule to resist the beginnings of evil."

U.S. Senator Barry Goldwater used the metaphor in expressing his opposition to the National Defense Education Act in 1958:

This bill and the foregoing remarks of the majority remind me of an old Arabian proverb: "If the camel once gets his nose in the tent, his body will soon follow." If adopted, the legislation will mark the inception of aid, supervision, and ultimately control of education in this country by the federal authorities.

The phrase was used in Reed v. King, 145 Cal.App.3d 261, 266, 193 Cal.Rptr. 130 (1983) "The paramount argument against an affirmative conclusion is it permits the camel's nose of unrestrained irrationality admission to the tent. If such an 'irrational' consideration is permitted as a basis of rescission the stability of all conveyances will be seriously undermined." The case in question involved a plaintiff suing because the defendant sold a house without telling them that the house's previous inhabitants had been brutally murdered 10 years earlier.

In 2019, a version of the phrase was used by Wisconsin Supreme Court Justice Ann Walsh Bradley in a concurring opinion addressing a coverage dispute among feuding liability insurers (Steadfast Ins. Co. v. Greenwich Ins. Co., 2019 WI 6), noting that allowing a non-breaching insurer to recover its attorney's fees from a breaching insurer would abrogate the American Rule (each party is responsible for its own fees regardless of result) to such an extent that "once the camel's nose is in the tent, the rest will likely follow."

== Related expressions ==
There are a number of other metaphors and expressions which refer to small changes leading to chains of events with undesirable or unexpected consequences, differing in nuances.

English language

- "Give them an inch; they'll take a mile." The original saying goes "Give them an inch, and they'll take an ell."
- "The thin end of the wedge", comparing the initial request to the shape of a wedge
- The 1985 children's book If You Give a Mouse a Cookie has been used for this analogy as well.

Other languages

- In Bulgarian culture: "if you let the pig under the bed today, tomorrow it will demand to be on the bed" (from a story about a pig who begs to sleep under the bed for warmth until it is granted, then the following night begs to sleep inside the bed)
- In Chinese culture: the "inch-mile" saying corresponds to the chengyu (four-character expression) 得隴望蜀 (délǒng-wàngshǔ), which is a quotation from the Book of Later Han about a Chinese general who took over Long (now Gansu) only to pursue further southwards into Shu (now Sichuan). Another more similar corresponding chengyu is dé cùn jìn chǐ (得寸進尺), meaning "Gain an inch and ask for a yard."
- In Danish: "When you give the Devil a little finger, he takes the whole hand" (når man rækker Fanden en lillefinger, tager han hele hånden).
- In Dutch: "If you give him a finger, he will take your whole hand" (als je hem een vinger geeft, neemt hij de hele hand)
- In French: "I offer him a finger, and he takes my arm"(Je lui donne un doigt, et il me prend le bras)
- In Finnish: "If you offer the devil [even just] a little finger, it takes the whole hand/arm" (Jos antaa pirulle pikkusormen, se vie koko käden
- In Georgian: "You let the hog loose on your foot, and it will crawl on the top of your head" (ღორის ტილს ფეხზე თუ დაისვამ, თავზე აგაღოღდებაო)
- In German: "If you give somebody the little finger, he will take your whole hand" (Gib jemandem den kleinen Finger, und er nimmt die ganze Hand)
- In Greek: "Give the peasant freedom, and he will hop on your bed" (Δώσε θάρρος στον χωριάτη να σ'ανέβει στο κρεβάτι)
- In Hindi: "Give a finger, pull the wrist" (उँगली पकड़ कर पहुँचा पकड़ना ).
- In Italian: "If you give them a finger, they will take your arm" (A chi dai il dito, si prende anche il braccio)
- In Malay culture: "Offer a calf, they want a thigh" (diberi betis, hendakkan paha)
- In Norwegian: "A rolling snowball will be harder to stop" (En rullende snøball er vanskeligere å stoppe)
- In Swedish: "If you give him the finger, he takes your whole hand." (Om du ger honom fingret så tar han hela handen)
- In Romanian: "Give a finger, he takes your hand." (Îi întinzi un deget, îți ia toată mâna, 'you give (reach to, offer, handing over, come to the help of one) one finger, he (the one you give *the finger* to) takes the whole hand.')
- In Russian: "Offer him a finger, and he will bite a hand off up to the elbow".
- In Polish: "Give him a finger and he'll take the whole arm!" commonly shortened to "Give him a finger...!"
  - Polish: "Give the hen a perch, and she'll say "I'll roost somewhere even higher!" (Daj kurze grzędę, a ona "Wyżej siędę!)
- In Portuguese: "You lend a hand, and they want the whole arm" (Você dá uma mão, e eles querem o braço inteiro)
- In Spanish: "You lend a hand, and they grab the elbow" (Uno le da la mano y le agarran el codo)
- Mexican Spanish: "You lend them a hand, and they grab you by the foot" (Les da uno la mano y se toman el pie)
- In Turkish: "Give someone an inch, and he'll take a yard." (Elini verip kolunu kaptırmak).
- In Vietnamese: "Taking the feet, they also take the head" (Được đằng chân, lân đằng đầu) .

== See also ==
- Boiling frog – the notion that gradual change tends to go unnoticed until it is too late, often discussed by drawing an analogy to a false story about what will allegedly happen to a frog in gradually warmed water
- Butterfly effect
- Creeping normality
- Domino effect
- Foot in the door – a persuasion technique
- For want of a nail – the claim that large consequences may follow from inattention to small details
- Slippery slope – an argument, sometimes fallacious
- Taking the piss
