= Ripple effect =

Disturbance that propagates through a system

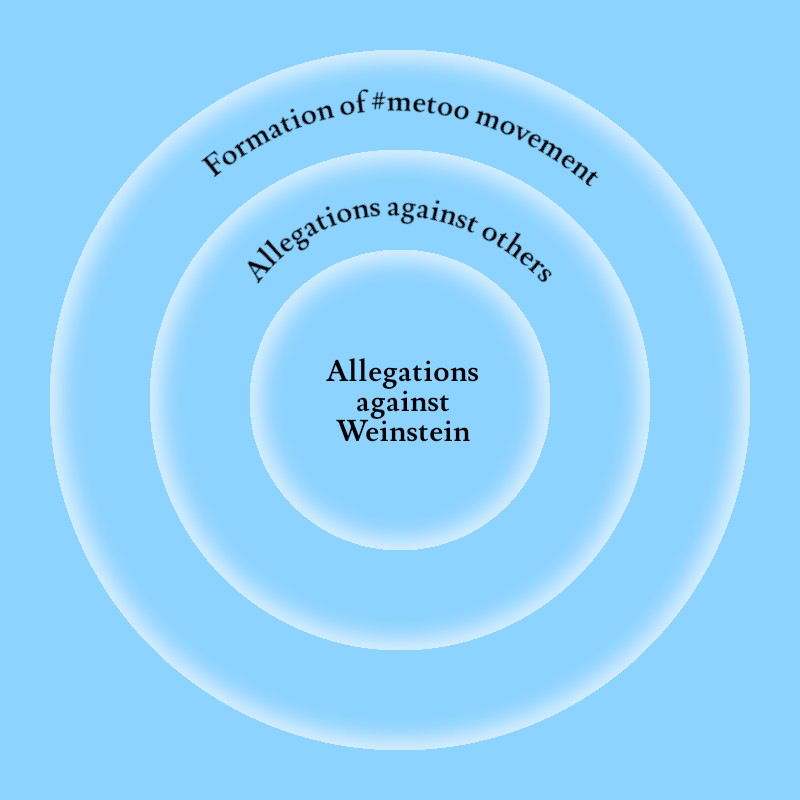
A diagram of the Ripple effect illustrating how the "Weinstein Scandal" led all the way to the rise of the Me Too movement

A ripple effect occurs when an initial disturbance to a system propagates outward to disturb an increasingly larger portion of the system, like ripples expanding across the water when an object is dropped into it.

The ripple effect is often used colloquially to mean a multiplier in macroeconomics. For example, an individual's reduction in spending reduces the incomes of others and their ability to spend. In a broader global context, research has shown how monetary policy decisions, especially by major economies like the US, can create ripple effects impacting economies worldwide, emphasizing the interconnectedness of today's global economy.

In sociology, the ripple effect can be observed in how social interactions can affect situations not directly related to the initial interaction, and in charitable activities where information can be disseminated and passed from the community to broaden its impact.

The concept has been applied in computer science within the field of software metrics as a complexity measure.

== Examples ==
=== The Weinstein effect and the rise of the Me Too movement ===
In October 2017, according to The New York Times and The New Yorker, dozens of women have accused American film producer Harvey Weinstein, former founder of Miramax Films and The Weinstein Company, of rape, sexual assault and sexual abuse for over a period of three decades. Shortly after over eighty accusations, Harvey was dismissed from his own company, expelled from the Academy of Motion Picture Arts and Sciences and other professional associations, and even retired from public view. The allegations against him resulted in a special case of ripple effect, now called the Weinstein effect. This means a global trend involving a serial number of sexual misconduct allegations towards other famous men in Hollywood, such as Louis CK and Kevin Spacey. The effect led to the formation of the controversial Me Too movement, where people share their experiences of sexual harassment/assault.

=== Corporate social responsibility ===
The effects of one company's decision to adopt a corporate social responsibility (CSR) programme on the attitudes and behaviours of rival companies has been likened to a ripple effect. Research by an international team in 2018 found that in many cases, one company's CSR initiative was seen as a competitive threat to other businesses in the same market, resulting in the adoption of further CSR initiatives.

== See also ==
- Butterfly effect⁣ — an effect where a minimal change in one state of a system results in large differences in its later state.
- Clapotis — a non-breaking standing wave with higher amplitude than the waves it's composed of.
- Domino effect — an effect where one event sets off a chain of non-incremental other events.
- Snowball effect — an effect where a process starting from an initial state of small significance builds upon itself in time.
- Unintended consequences — unexpected effects of an act carried out for another purpose
