= Moving the goalposts =

Metaphor originating from goal sports

Moving the goalposts (or shifting the goalposts) is a metaphor, derived from goal-based sports such as football and hockey, that means to change the rule or criterion ("goal") of a process or competition while it is still in progress, in such a way that the new goal offers one side an advantage or disadvantage.

== Etymology ==
This phrase is British in origin and derives from sports that use goalposts. The figurative use alludes to the perceived unfairness in changing the goal one is trying to achieve after the process one is engaged in (such as a game of football) has already started.

== Logical fallacy ==
Moving the goalposts is an informal fallacy in which evidence presented in response to a specific claim is dismissed and some other (often greater) evidence is demanded. That is, after an attempt has been made to score a goal, the goalposts are moved to exclude the attempt. The problem with changing the rules of the game is that the meaning of the result is changed, too. The opposite of moving the goalposts is lowering the bar.

== Use ==
Some include this metaphor as a description of a tactic of workplace bullying. In such cases, re-defining another's goals may be intentionally devised so as to assure that they will never be able to finally achieve the ever-shifting goals.

== Non-metaphorical use ==
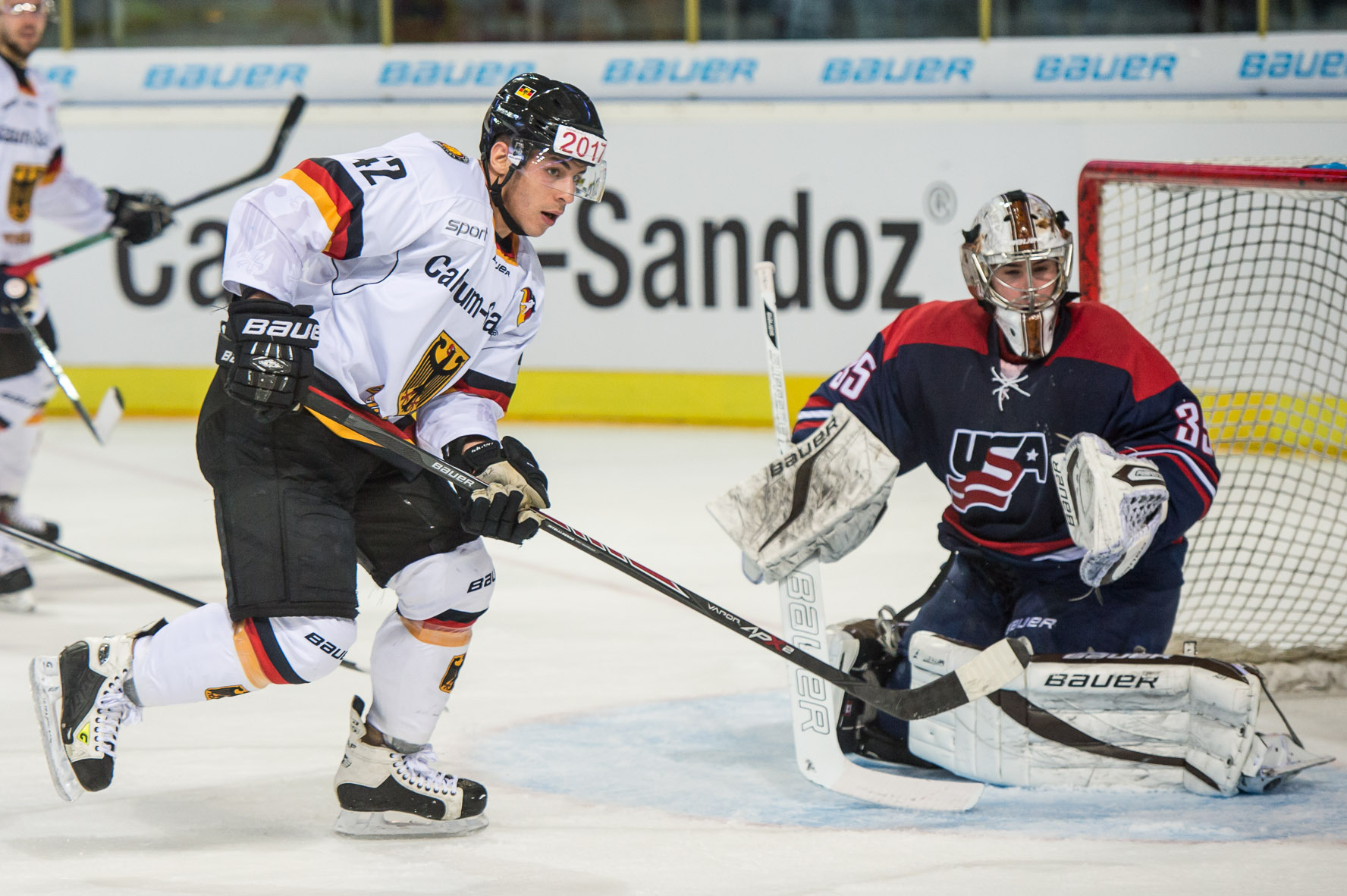
Goaltender David Leggio (in goal at right) regularly moved his goalposts as a strategy to stop play until the tactic was outlawed.

Deliberately moving the goalposts constitutes a professional foul in rugby football and an unfair act in gridiron football. The officials are granted carte blanche to assess whatever penalty they see fit, including awarding the score for any attempt at a goal missed or invalidating any goal scored as a result of the moved goalposts. In both rugby and gridiron, goalposts are anchored into the ground; the distance they can be moved (most easily in gridiron by pulling down on one end of the crossbar to tilt both posts either to the left or the right) is far more restricted. Inadvertently moving the goalposts in a touchdown celebration is an unsportsmanlike conduct penalty of 15 yards against the offending team.

Moving goalposts is common in ice hockey, where physical contact with the posts is common. If the goalposts are knocked off their moorings in the course of play, play is stopped until the goal is put back in place. If the goalposts are deliberately moved to stop an opponent from scoring, the opponent may be granted a penalty shot; if the goaltender does so, the goaltender may be ejected from the game, a rule imposed at most levels of the game in 2014 after David Leggio deliberately moved the goalposts during a two-person breakaway, believing he would have a better chance of stopping a penalty shot. Leggio later used the tactic in the Deutsche Eishockey Liga, where he had played since 2015; that league had not yet outlawed the maneuver, but promptly did so after Leggio's first attempt at using the tactic. The DEL instead automatically awards the goal to the opposing team. The National Hockey League approved this rule in 2019.

In 2009, Danish goalkeeper Kim Christensen was recorded on camera moving the goalposts in order to gain advantage over the opposing team. Christensen's moving the goalposts was discovered by a referee about 20 minutes into the game, but Christensen did not suffer a suspension or any fines for his actions.

In May 2022, a scandal erupted when video published by Aftenposten showed Viking FK's goalkeeper Patrik Gunnarsson reducing his goal size by moving the goalposts by 15–20 centimetres (6–8 in), after the referee inspection but prior to kickoff, in home games during the 2022 season.

== See also ==
- Ambit claim
- Bait-and-switch
- Creeping normality
- Destabilisation
- God of the gaps
- Mind games
- Motte-and-bailey fallacy
- Nirvana fallacy
- No true Scotsman
- "They Just Keep Moving the Line", song
- Overton window
- Special pleading
- Setting up to fail
- Slippery slope
- Texas sharpshooter fallacy
