= Shelley Gillen =

Canadian producer

- Occupations: Producer; Screenwriter
- Notable work: The Listener (2009); Murdoch Mysteries (2009)

Shelley Gillen is a Canadian producer, screenwriter and songwriter.

== Biography ==
From 1994 to 2007, she was a senior pay-TV executive and helped other Canadian screenwriters, directors and producers bring their product to the screen. As Head of Creative Affairs for Movie Central, Corus Entertainment, she commissioned the network's first original drama series, serving as executive-in-charge-of production on ground-breakers such as ReGenesis (2004), Terminal City (2005), Durham County (2007) and Slings & Arrows (2003).

She played an integral role in the development and financing of more than a hundred feature films, including two Oscar nominees, Deepa Mehta's Water (2005) and Sarah Polley's Away from Her (2006), and was credited as an executive producer on Andrew Currie's Fido (2006).

In 2003, she was awarded with a Wayne Black Service Award from Women in Film and Television Vancouver and a Leo Awards for Outstanding Individual Achievement.

== Filmography ==
=== Producer ===
==== Television ====
- 2010 : Paper Promises by Shane Harvey.
- 2009 : Murdoch Mysteries by Cal Coons, Maureen Jennings and Alexandra Zarowny.
- 2009 : The Listener by Michael Amo and Sam Egan.
- 2009 : How to Boil a Frog by Jon Cooksey.

==== Cinema ====
- 2006 : Fido by Andrew Currie.
- 1991 : Clearcut by Ryszard Bugajski.

=== Screenwriter ===
- 2018 : A Father's Nightmare by Vic Sarin.
- 2014 : A Daughter's Nightmare by Vic Sarin.
- 2013 : A Sister's Nightmare by Vic Sarin.
- 2012 : A Mother's Nightmare by Vic Sarin.
- 1997 : Kleo the Misfit Unicorn by Gordon Stanfield.

=== Songwriter ===
- 2014 : No Regrets (music by Shane Harvey), performed by Emily Osment in the movie A Daughter's Nightmare.
- 2012 : Love Me Til You Die (music by Alexandra Mihill), performed by Jessica Lowndes in the movies A Mother's Nightmare and A Father's Nightmare.
- 2010 : She Was My Momma and Till I'm Dead And Gone (music by Shane Harvey), performed by Larry Harvey in the documentary Paper Promises.
- 1988 : Listen To The People (music by Shane Harvey), performed by Shane Harvey.
- 1987 : Ricky (music by Shane Harvey), performed by Shane Harvey.
