= How to Boil a Frog =

2010 Canadian TV movie

- Written by: Jon Cooksey
- Directed by: Jon Cooksey
- Narrated by: Jon Cooksey
- Theme music composer: Michael Richard Plowman
- Country of origin: Canada
- Original language: English

Production
- Producers: Jon Cooksey; Shelley Gillen; Teri Woods-McArter; Scott Renyard; Vandy Savage
- Cinematography: Jon Cooksey
- Editor: David Grave
- Running time: 88 minutes
- Production company: Fools Bay Entertainment

Original release
- Release: September 8, 2010

How to Boil a Frog is a 2010 Canadian eco-comedy documentary film written and directed by Jon Cooksey to show the consequences of too many people using up Earth resources and suggesting five ways that the filmmakers say people can save habitability on the Earth while improving their own lives at the same time.

Its title repeats the common misconception that one can boil a frog by heating it very gradually.

== Cast ==
- Jon Cooksey as conductor / narrator
- Debbie Cook as herself, Association for the Study of Peak Oil and Gas member
- Julian Darley as himself, journalist
- Yvo de Boer as himself - climate change czar
- Michael Edwards as police officer
- Gigi Gaskins as herself, Peak Oil Nashville
- Ross Gelbspan as himself, author
- James Inhofe as himself (archive footage)
- George Monbiot as himself, author / journalist
- Chris Mooney as himself, journalist
- Naomi Oreskes as herself, science historian
- Matthew Simmons as himself, energy expert
- Chris Turner as himself, author
- Rex Weyler as himself, ecologist / journalist
- George W. Bush as himself (archive footage)

== Release ==
The film premiered in September 2010 on Canadian television, followed by screenings at various film festivals in Canada and the U.S.and began streaming in 2017 on the Canadian website, The Green Channel. https://thegreenchannel.tv

== Recognition ==
=== Awards and nominations ===
- 2010, Won 'Best Environmental Film', Film Shift Movie Festival
- 2010, Won 'Best Concept Documentary', Los Angeles Movie Awards
- 2010, Won 'Best Visual Effects - Documentary', Los Angeles Movie Awards
- 2010, Won 'Best Documentary', Los Angeles Movie Awards
- 2010, Won 'Best Green Film', Mammoth Film Festival
- 2011, Won 'Grand Prix', Silafest
- 2011, Won 'Special Mention Animation Film Award', Monaco International Film Festival
- 2011, Won 'Best Editing', Silafest
- 2011, Won 'Best Screenplay', Silafest
- 2011, Won 'Environmental Conservation Award', CMS Vatavaran Environment and Wildlife Film Festival, Delhi, India
- 2011, Won 'Best Film', Yellow Fever Film Festival, Belfast, Northern Ireland
- 2011, Nominated 'Best Writing in a Documentary Program or Series', 28th Annual Gemini Awards
- 2011, Finalist 'Best Writing - Documentary', Writers Guild of Canada Screenwriting Awards
