= Ancient and Horribles Parade =

Parade in Chepachet, Rhode Island, US

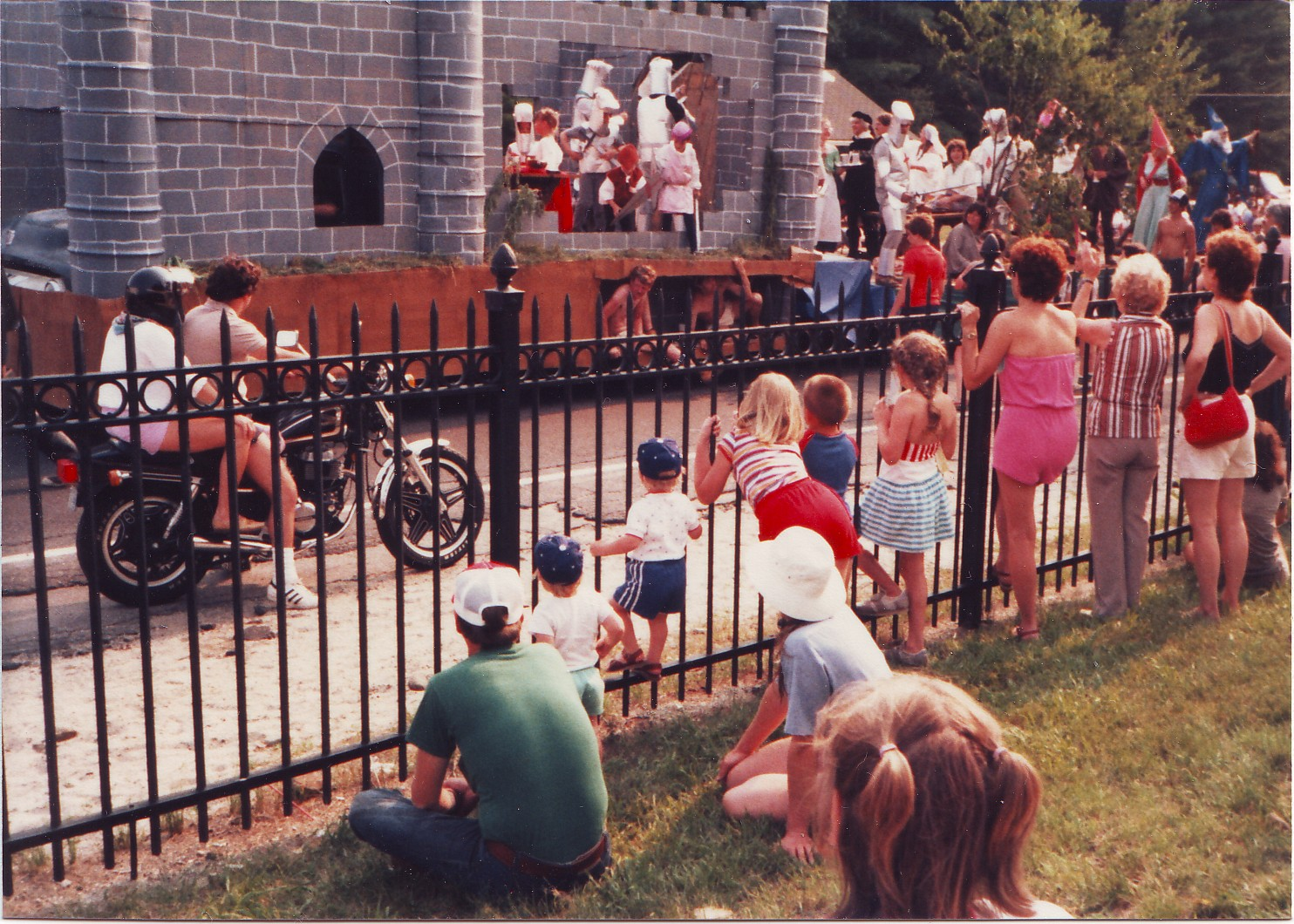
Ancient and Horribles Parade in 1984

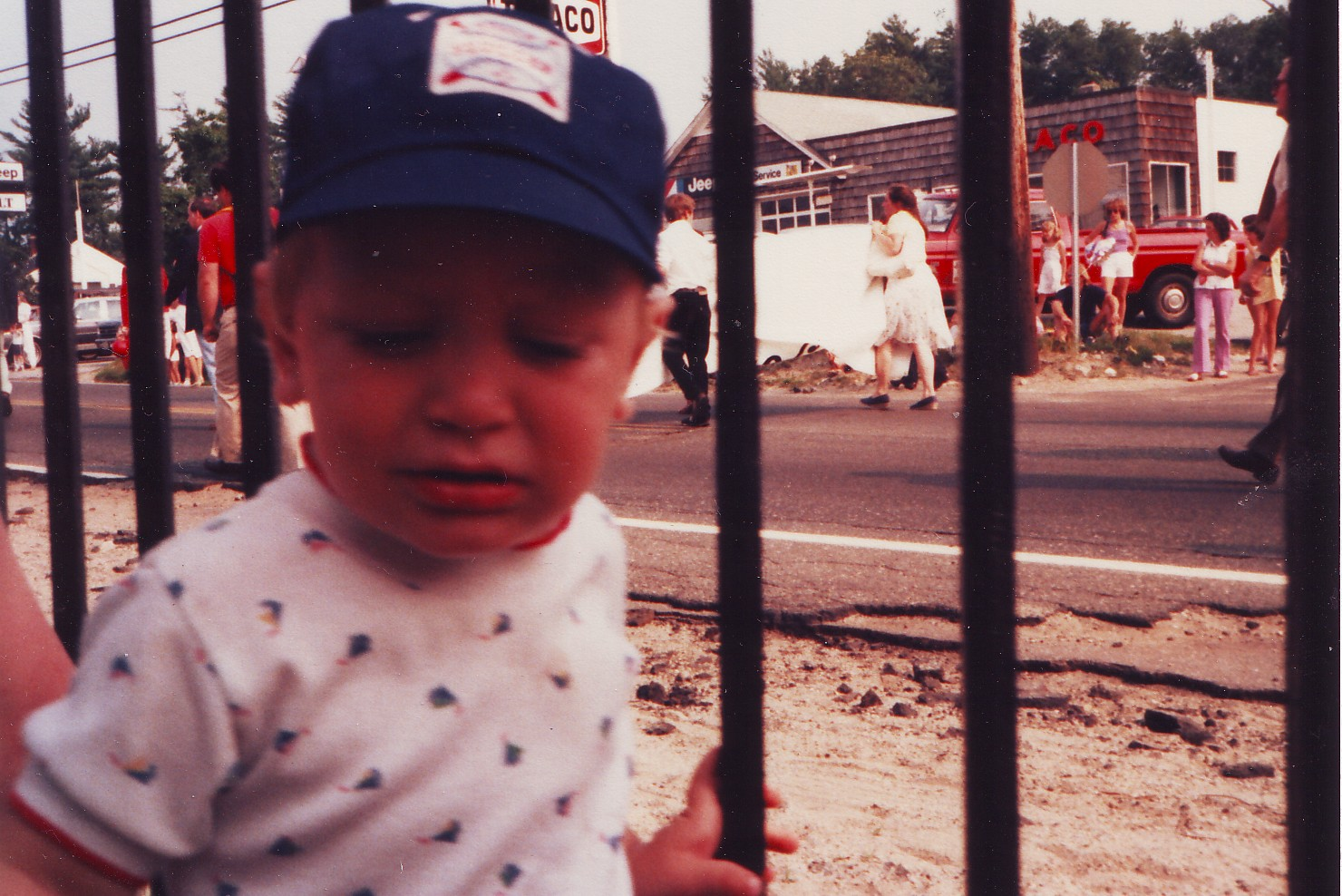
Child at Ancient and Horribles Parade in 1984

Ancient and Horribles Parade, founded in 1926, is a nationally known Fourth of July parade on U.S. Route 44 (Putnam Pike) in the village of Chepachet, Rhode Island, in the town of Glocester. Parades of horribles were a New England tradition dating back prior to the 1870s or earlier in various small towns across New England.

== History ==
The oldest known Ancient and Horribles Parade in New England occurred on July 4, 1851, in Lowell, Massachusetts and was named as a parody of the more somber Ancient and Honorable Artillery Company of Massachusetts, the oldest military organization in the United States. New Englanders in several cities started parading in concert with other New England towns in the middle of the 1800s in "Ancient and Horrible" or "Antique and Horribles" parades. The dress was meant to satirize politicians and other public figures. This had largely died out by 1900 in Vermont. Gloucester, Massachusetts, continues to have a "Horribles Parade" into the 21st century but without the satirical political dimension the costumes once held.

Glocester Rhode Island's "Ancient and Horribles Parade" was founded in 1926 when Calvin Coolidge was U.S. President. Coolidge was a member of the original Ancient and Honorable Artillery Company in Boston. According to the 2008 chair of the parade, Connie Leathers, "...Rhode Islanders being Rhode Islanders made fun of them." The Parade features both traditional Fourth of July floats and marchers, such as veterans and fire trucks, as well as often irreverent, satirical displays commenting on political and cultural issues.

There was no parade in 1942–1945 during World War II nor in 2020-2021 during the COVID-19 pandemic.

== See also ==
- Ancient and Honorable Artillery Company of Massachusetts
- Glocester, Rhode Island
- Swamp Yankee
