= Taking the piss =

Commonwealth slang

Taking the piss is a colloquial term meaning to either mock at the expense of others, or to be joking, without the element of offence; or to be "unfair" and take more than is warranted. It is a shortening of the idiom taking the piss out of, which is an expression meaning to mock, tease, joke, ridicule, or scoff. Extracting the urine, taking the Mickey (Mickey Bliss, Cockney rhyming slang), taking the Mick or taking the Michael are additional terms for making fun of someone. These terms are most often used in the United Kingdom, Ireland, South Africa, New Zealand, and Australia.

== Usage ==
The term sometimes refers to a form of mockery in which the mocker exaggerates the other person's characteristics, pretending to take on their attitudes, etc., for the purpose of comedic effect at their expense. This would be described as "taking the piss" out of that person, or "a piss-take". It may also be used for a ruse in which a person is led to believe a plainly unbelievable fact for the purpose of ridiculing them.

The other form refers to any situation where a second party takes more than their fair share ("Give them an inch and they'll take a mile"), their behaviour causes aggravation, or something far exceeds what is expected or wanted (e.g. "£10 for a burger—that's taking the piss!").

The phrase is in common use throughout Britain and to a lesser extent Ireland, being employed by headline writers in broadsheet gazettes and tabloids, as well as colloquially. It is also used in other English-speaking countries, such as Australia.

== Origin ==
"Take the piss" may be a reference to the related (and dated) idiomatic expression piss-proud, which is a vulgar pun referring to the morning erection that a man may have when he awakens or may be caused by a full bladder pressing upon nerves that help effect an erection. This could be considered a "false" erection, as its origin is physiological, not psychosexual, so in a metaphoric sense, then, someone who is "piss-proud" would suffer from false pride, and taking the piss out of them refers to deflating this false pride, through disparagement or mockery. As knowledge of the expression's metaphoric origin became lost on users, "taking the piss out of" came to be synonymous with disparagement or mockery itself, with less regard to the pride of the subject.

"Take the mickey" may be an abbreviated form of the Cockney rhyming slang "take the Mickey Bliss", a euphemism for "take the piss". The phrase has been noted since the 1930s.
