= Salami slicing tactics =

Divide and conquer process

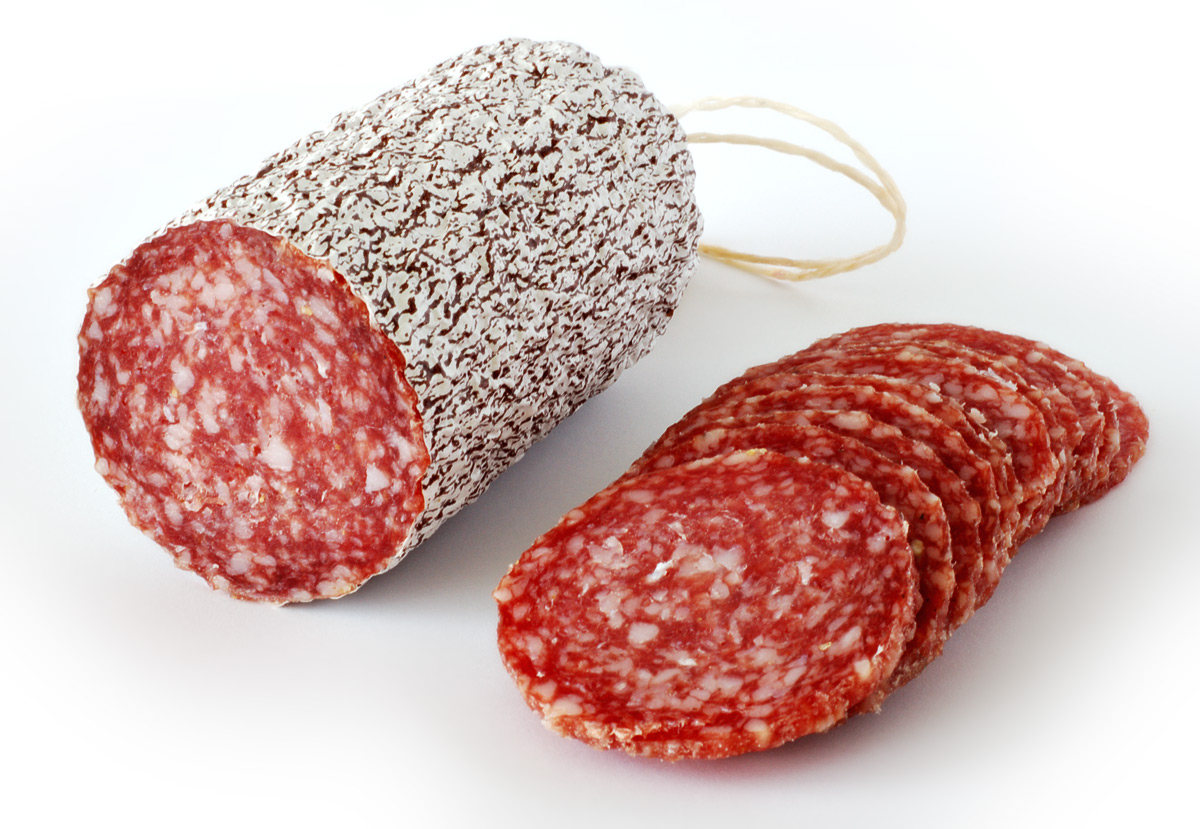
The metaphor refers to salami cured meat, which can be very thinly sliced.

Salami slicing tactics, also known as salami slicing, salami tactics, the salami-slice strategy, or salami attacks, is the practice of using a series of many small actions to produce a much larger action or result that would be difficult or unlawful to perform all at once.

Salami slicing can be used to describe a divide and conquer process of threats and alliances to overcome opposition.

Salami tactics are a generally subversive strategy used extensively in geopolitics, such as countries attempting to expand their borders, and war games as a method of achieving goals gradually without provoking significant escalation.

Perhaps the most famous example of the salami tactic was through WWII and into the start of the Cold War, with the formation of the Eastern Bloc in Europe by the USSR. By the time WWII ended, Eastern Europe was under the control of the Soviets. This advantage was used to ensure the election of submissive communist satellite states in several countries. As a result, from 1945 to 1949 through a series of slices, the USSR was able to bring Albania, Czechoslovakia, Poland, Romania, Hungary, and East Germany under its control without escalating incidents between its near peer adversaries.

In finance, the term "salami attack" is used to describe schemes by which large sums are fraudulently accumulated by repeated transfers of imperceptibly small sums of money.

== Origins in politics ==
The first use of salami slicing in politics - and the original Hungarian term (Hungarian: szalámitaktika) - is commonly attributed to Hungarian politician Mátyás Rákosi, who described the actions of the Hungarian Communist Party in its acquisition of power in the Second Hungarian Republic.

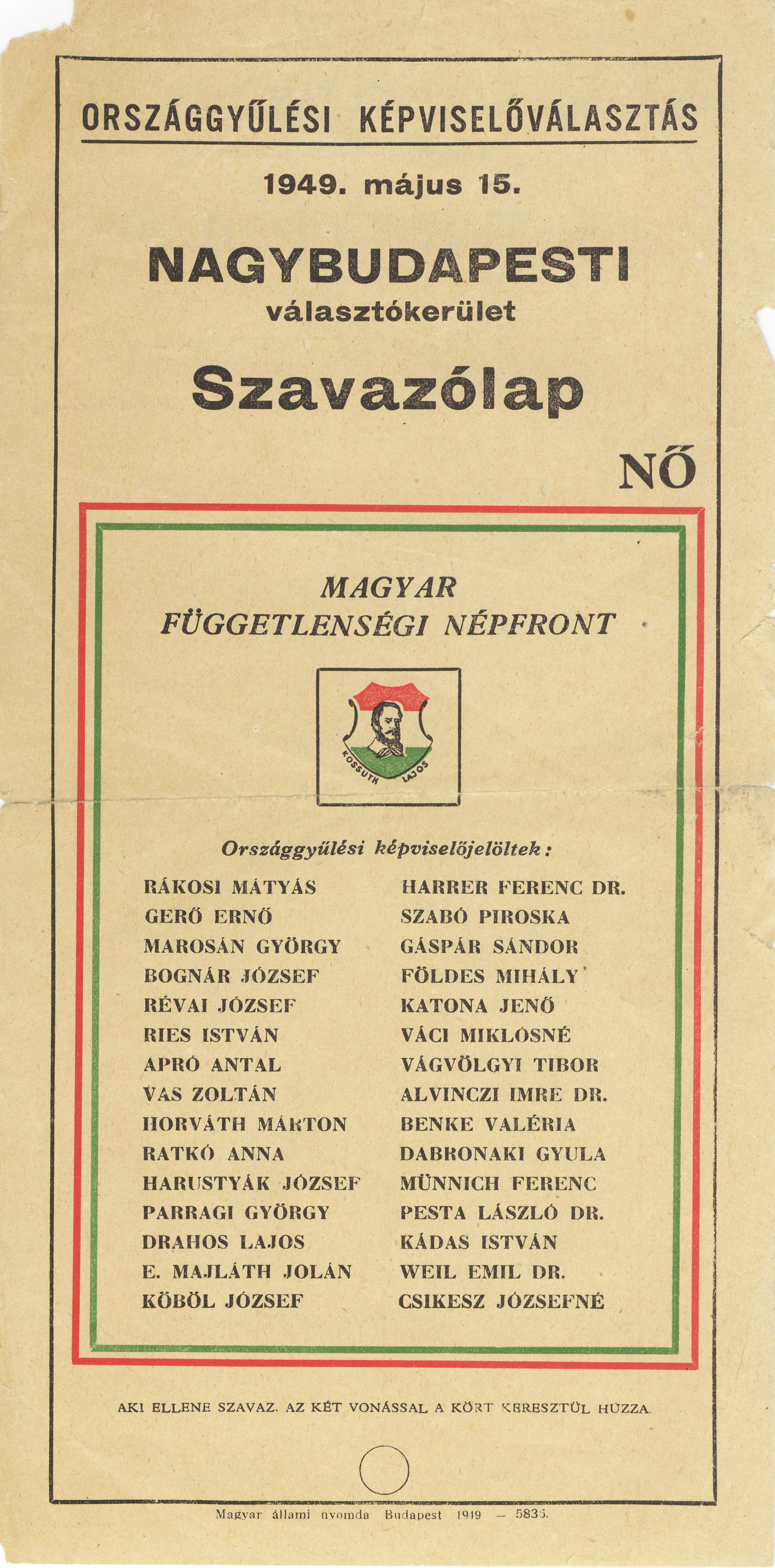
A ballot with only one option from 1949.

Noting that salami, an expensive food, is not eaten all at once, but is cut one slice at a time, Rákosi claimed he removed the influence of Hungary's leading, center-right, Smallholders' Party through a "step-by-step approach ... known as the 'Salami tactic,' and thanks to it we were able, day after day, to slice off, to cut up the reactionary forces skulking in the Smallholders' Party." By portraying his opponents as fascists (or at the very least fascist sympathizers), Rákosi was able to get the opposition to push out its own right wing, then its center, then the more independent-minded elements of the left wing, leaving only "fellow travellers" willing to collaborate with the Communists.

Another similar technique became known as the "Kékcédulás Választás", when ballot papers were forged so that one person can vote more than once. However, according to historian Norman Stone, the term might have been invented by Hungarian Independence Party leader Zoltán Pfeiffer, a hardline anti-communist opponent of Rákosi.

Thomas C. Schelling wrote in his 1966 book Arms and Influence:

Salami tactics, we can be sure, were invented by a child […] Tell a child not to go in the water and he'll sit on the bank and submerge his bare feet; he is not yet 'in' the water. Acquiesce, and he'll stand up; no more of him is in the water than before. Think it over, and he'll start wading, not going any deeper; take a moment to decide whether this is different and he'll go a little deeper, arguing that since he goes back and forth it all averages out. Pretty soon we are calling to him not to swim out of sight, wondering whatever happened to all our discipline.

== Geopolitics ==
=== China ===
In 2021, the European Parliamentary Research Service accused China of using the salami slice strategy to gradually increase its presence in The South China Sea. Examples of this strategy are the Spratley Islands dispute, the Scarborough Shoal standoff, and more broadly China's Nine-dash line claims over virtually the whole entire South China Sea. China repeatedly uses its coast guard and merchant fishing vessels as a paramilitary fleet to intimidate its neighbors, often referred to as grey zone tactics.

China's salami slicing actions provoked wide international condemnation, especially in regards to its island neighbor. China claims Taiwan as part of its sovereign territory via the One-China Policy. In January 2019, Chinese leader Xi Jinping essentially said he would use military force to reunify with Taiwan if he had to. In August 2022, then US House Speaker Nancy Pelosi visited Taiwan, which further escalated international tensions following the COVID-19 pandemic. Shortly after her visit in 2022, then US President Joe Biden effectively stated America would go to war with China should they attempt a Taiwan invasion. In 2024, the Chinese military flew near Taiwanese airspace over 3,000 times, an increase from the roughly 1,700 flights in 2022 and 2023. During the second presidency of Donald Trump, the US seemingly walked back claims of war over Taiwan, and appeared to pursue the method of strategic ambiguity on the matter.

== Financial schemes ==
Computerized banking systems make it possible to repeatedly divert tiny amounts of money, typically due to rounding off, to a beneficiary's account. This general concept is used in popular automatic-savings apps. It has also been said to be behind fraudulent schemes, whereby bank transactions calculated to the nearest smallest unit of currency leave unaccounted-for fractions of a unit, for fraudsters to divert into other amounts. Snopes in 2001 dismissed a popular account of such an embezzlement scheme as a legend.

In Los Angeles, in October 1998, district attorneys charged four men with fraud for allegedly installing computer chips in gasoline pumps that cheated consumers by slightly overstating the amounts pumped. The fraud was noticed by consumers who found that they had been charged for volumes of gasoline greater than their cars' gas tank capacities.

In 2008, a man was arrested for fraudulently creating 58,000 accounts which he used to collect money through verification deposits from online brokerage firms, a few cents at a time.

In 1996, a fare box serviceman in Edmonton, Canada, was sentenced to four years' imprisonment for stealing coins from the city's transit agency fare boxes. Over 13 years, he stole 37 tonnes of coins, with a face value of nearly CA$2.4 million, using a magnet to lift the coins (made primarily of steel or nickel at the time) out of the fare boxes one at a time.

In Buffalo, New York, a fare box serviceman stole more than US$200,000 in quarters from the local transit agency over an eight-year period stretching from 2003 to 2011 and was sentenced to thirty months in prison.

== Academic publishing strategy ==
Scientists are often evaluated by a number of papers published and similar criteria. In this context, salami slicing refers to "fragmenting single coherent bodies of research into as many publications as possible". If the fragment is too small it may be too hard to publish, so this includes forming minimal publishable items. It can be harder to collect, digest, understand and evaluate the research when scattered in a number of sources. It also leads to repetitive descriptions of context, bibliography lists and so on. Regarding that it is costly to scientific dissemination process, it is often considered a bad practice or even unethical. Some authors managed to divide research to extreme proportions. Salami slicing "can result in a distortion of the literature by leading unsuspecting readers to believe that data presented in each salami slice (i.e., journal article) is derived from a different subject sample".

Salami slicing is considered a type of scientific misconduct.

== Cultural references ==
=== Film ===
In the 2016 film Arrival, the character Agent Halpern mentions that a Hungarian word means to eliminate one's enemies one by one. An ORIGO writer and IMDB wrote that this alludes to szalámitaktika.

Salami slicing has played a key role in the plots of several films, including Hackers, Superman III, and Office Space.

=== Television ===
In a 1972 episode of the TV series M*A*S*H, Radar attempts to ship an entire Jeep home from Korea one piece at a time. Hawkeye commented that his mailman "would have a retroactive hernia" if he found out.

In a 1986 episode of Yes, Prime Minister, "The Grand Design", the government's chief scientific adviser walks Prime Minister Hacker through how salami tactics work and would prevent the prime minister from using nuclear weapons.

=== Music ===
Johnny Cash's "One Piece at a Time" has a similar plot to the aforementioned M*A*S*H episode, but with a Cadillac made up of parts spanning model years 1949 through 1973.

== See also ==
- Creeping normality
- Death by a thousand cuts
- Defeat in detail
- Deterrence theory
- Embrace, extend, and extinguish
- Facts on the ground
- First they came ...
- Foco strategy
- Võ Nguyên Giáp § Vietnam War
- Gradualism
- Goodhart's law
- Slippery slope
- Structuring
