= The Vocation of Man =

1799 book by Johann Gottlieb Fichte

The Vocation of Man (German: Die Bestimmung des Menschen) is a work by Johann Gottlieb Fichte. The work was originally published by Fichte in 1799 and translated into English by Jane Sinnett in 1846 and by William Smith in 1848. Fichte identifies three distinct stages in the development of faith: 1. Doubt, 2. Knowledge, 3. Faith.

== See also ==
- Butterfly effect
