= Snowball effect =

Metaphorical term for a process that builds upon itself

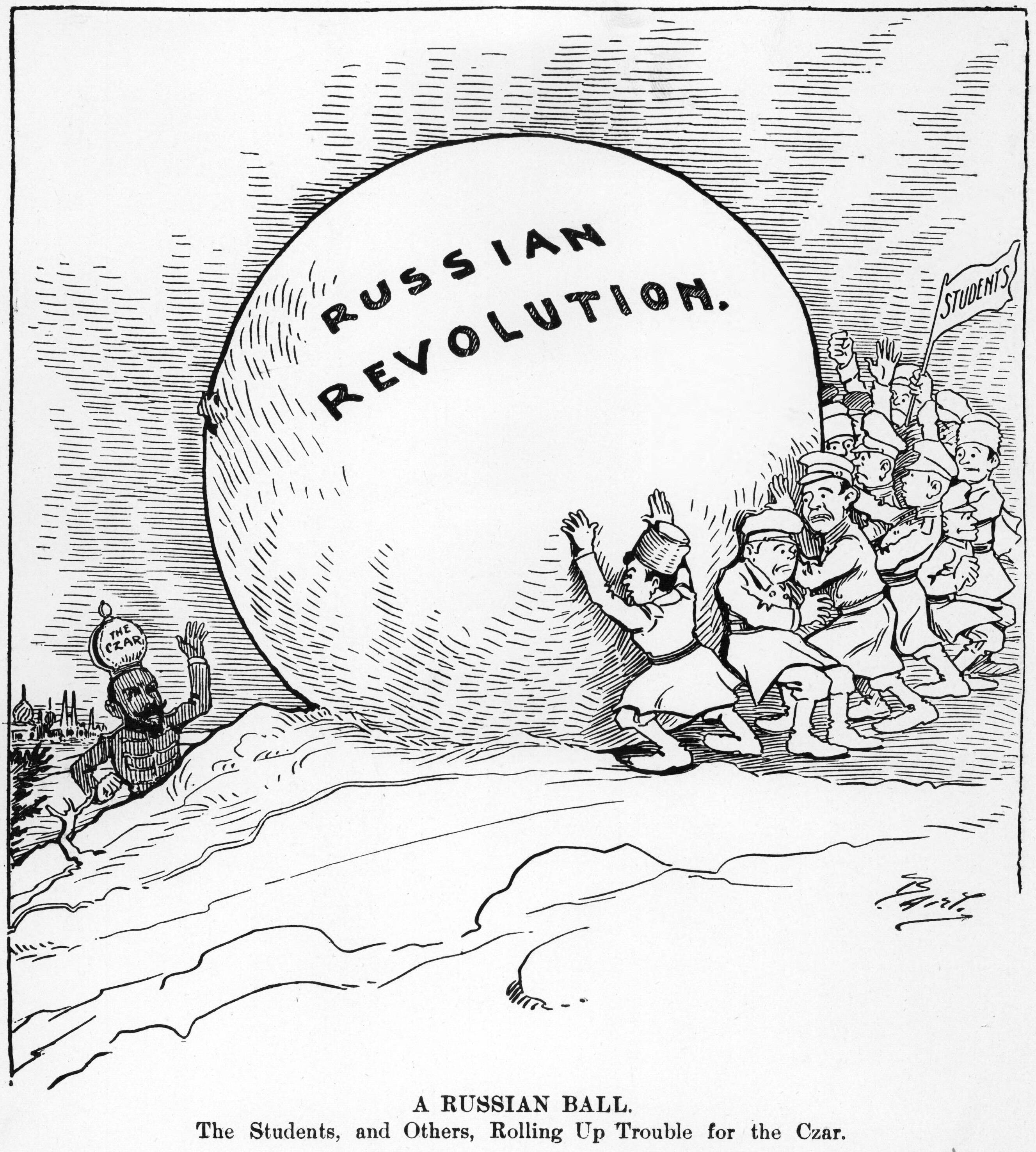
Minneapolis Journal cartoon showing students "rolling up trouble" for Nicholas II, in what would become the Russian Revolution of 1905

A snowball effect is a process that starts from an initial state of small significance and builds upon itself (an exacerbating feedback), becoming larger (graver, more serious), and also perhaps potentially more dangerous or disastrous (a vicious circle), though it might be beneficial instead (a virtuous circle). This is a cliché in cartoons and modern theatrics, and it is also used in psychology.

The common analogy is with the rolling of a snowball down a snow-covered hillside. As it rolls the ball will pick up more snow, gaining more mass and surface area, and picking up even more snow and momentum as it rolls along.

In aerospace engineering, it is used to describe the multiplication effect in an original weight saving. A reduction in the weight of the fuselage will require less lift, meaning the wings can be smaller. Hence less thrust is required and therefore smaller engines, resulting in a greater weight saving than the original reduction. This iteration can be repeated several times, although the decrease in weight gives diminishing returns.

The startup process of a feedback electronic oscillator, when power to the circuit is switched on, is a technical application of the snowball effect. Electronic noise is amplified by the oscillator circuit and returned to its input filtered to contain primarily the selected (desired) frequency, gradually getting stronger in each cycle, until a steady-state oscillation is established, when the circuit parameters satisfy the Barkhausen stability criterion.

== See also ==
- Austrian business cycle theory, particularly the government policy error of further credit expansion
- Black hole
- Butterfly effect
- Chain reaction
- Clapotis
- Domino effect
- Katamari Damacy, a video game based on the snowball effect
- Matthew effect
- Positive feedback
- Preferential attachment
- The Road to Serfdom
- Runaway-leader syndrome in unbalanced games
- Self-fulfilling prophecy
- Slippery slope
- Snowball sampling
- Streisand effect
- Tyranny of small decisions
- Wealth concentration
