= Domino effect =

Cumulative effect produced when one event sets off a chain of other events

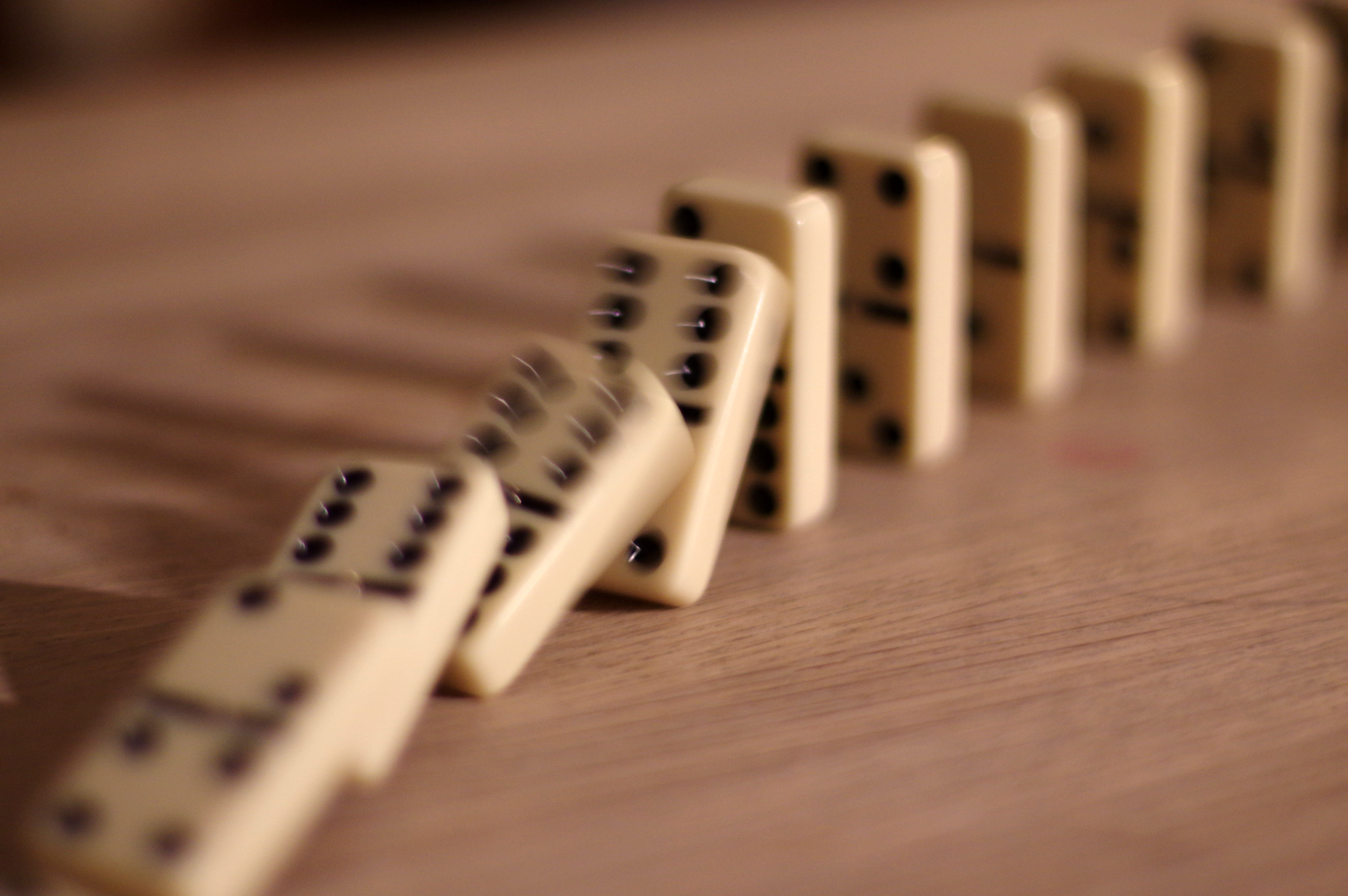
A falling line of dominoes, each knocking the next over

The Domino effect can be seen when a large flock of Greylag Geese takes off, it starts with a few, then the whole flock is affected and everyone takes off one after another.

A domino effect is the cumulative effect produced when one event sets off a series of similar or related events, a form of chain reaction. The term is an analogy to a falling row of dominoes. It typically refers to a linked sequence of events where the time between successive events is relatively short. The term can be used literally (about a series of actual collisions) or metaphorically (about causal linkages within systems such as global finance or politics).

The literal, mechanical domino effect is exploited in Rube Goldberg machines. In chemistry, the principle applies to a domino reaction, in which one chemical reaction sets up the conditions necessary for a subsequent one that soon follows. In the realm of process safety, a domino-effect accident is an initial undesirable event triggering additional ones in related equipment or facilities, leading to a total incident effect more severe than the primary accident alone.

The metaphorical usage implies that an outcome is inevitable or highly likely (as it has already started to happen) – a form of slippery slope argument. When this outcome is actually unlikely (the argument is fallacious), it has also been called the domino fallacy.

== See also ==
- Behavioral contagion – Spontaneous, unsolicited and uncritical imitation of another's behavior
- Butterfly effect – Idea that small causes can have large effects
- Cascading failure – Systemic risk of failure
- Causality – How one process influences another
- Chinese whispers – Children's game
- Copycat crime – Criminal act that is inspired by a previous crime
- Domino theory – Cold War–era geopolitical theory on the spread of communism
- Kessler syndrome – Theoretical satellite collision cascade
- Mathematical induction – Form of mathematical proof
- Placebo effect – Substance or treatment of no therapeutic value
- Side effect – Outcome that is secondary to the one intended
- Ripple effect – Disturbance that propagates through a system
- Snowball effect – Metaphorical term for a process that builds upon itself
