= Appeal to probability =

Type of formal fallacy

An appeal to probability (or appeal to possibility, also known as possibiliter ergo probabiliter, "possibly, therefore probably") is the logical fallacy of taking something for granted because it is possibly the case. The fact that an event is possible does not imply that the event is probable, nor that the event was realized.

== Example ==
A fallacious appeal to possibility:

If it can happen (premise).
It will happen. (invalid conclusion)

Something can go wrong (premise).
Therefore, something will go wrong (invalid conclusion).

If I do not bring my umbrella (premise)
It will rain. (invalid conclusion).

Murphy's law is a (typically deliberate, tongue-in-cheek) invocation of the fallacy.

== See also ==
- Slippery slope
- Neglect of probability
