= Chepachet, Rhode Island =

Census-designated place in Rhode Island, United States

Coordinates: 41°54′54″N 71°40′17″W

- Chepachet Village Historic District
- U.S. National Register of Historic Places
- U.S. Historic district
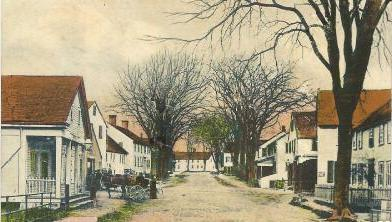
- Chepachet depicted in a 1905 postcard

- Location within Rhode Island Location within the United States
- Location: Glocester, Rhode Island
- Built: 1799
- NRHP reference No.: 71000031
- Added to NRHP: March 31, 1971

Location of the CDP in Providence County and the state of Rhode Island

Chepachet is a village and census-designated place (CDP) in the town of Glocester in the northwestern part of the U.S. state of Rhode Island. It is centered at the intersection of U.S. Route 44 (a.k.a. Putnam Pike) and Rhode Island Route 102 (also known as Victory Highway and Chopmist Hill Road). Chepachet's ZIP code is 02814. As of the 2020 census, Chepachet had a population of 1,704.

== History ==
"Chepachet" was originally inhabited by the Pequot and Nipmuc natives; the name means "where rivers meet".

Leading up to the American Revolution, the area was a hotbed for supporters of independence, and the Gloucester Light Infantry was founded in the Chepachet in 1774. During the Revolutionary War Loyalists from Newport were exiled near Chepachet, including Thomas Vernon, who recorded election celebrations in Chepachet in 1776:

This being the day for the choice of Deputies (members of the General Assembly). We are told that there is a very great resort of people of all kinds at Chepasseh, and that it is a day of great frolicking. Our landlord and his three sons are gone, having rigged themselves out in the best manner. [A] man on horseback passed by (together with many others) with a very large bag full of cakes made by Granne West (mother to the General William West) which are to be sold to the people.

In 1842, Chepachet was the setting of the endgame of the Dorr Rebellion, which helped to win voting rights for non-landowners in a new state Constitution.

On November 4, 1923, horror writer H. P. Lovecraft and his fellow writer C. M. Eddy, Jr. ventured to Chepachet in search of a place known as "Dark Swamp" of which they had heard rumors. They never located it, but the region inspired at least the opening of Lovecraft's story (novelette) "The Colour Out of Space", and the setting contributed to Eddy's unfinished story "Black Noon". Chepachet is also mentioned several times in Lovecraft's story (novelette) "The Horror at Red Hook".

Since 1926, the town has hosted the Ancients and Horribles parade, an annual Fourth of July event, notable for its political statements and ribald humor.

In the 1940s, a US Navy auxiliary ship, the fleet fuel oil tanker, USS Chepachet, was named after the Chepachet River which runs through the village. The ship's bell is displayed at the seat of town government, and the ship's surviving crew had a 50th anniversary reunion in the town in 1998.

Beginning with a proclamation in 1976, May 25 is recognized as "Elephant Day". On that date in 1826, a popular elephant known as Betty the Learned Elephant from a traveling show was shot and killed while she was crossing the bridge spanning the Chepachet River. A group of six "hooligans" led by Canton Smith of nearby North Scituate faced charges for the crime. A commemorative plaque marks the historic location on the bridge.

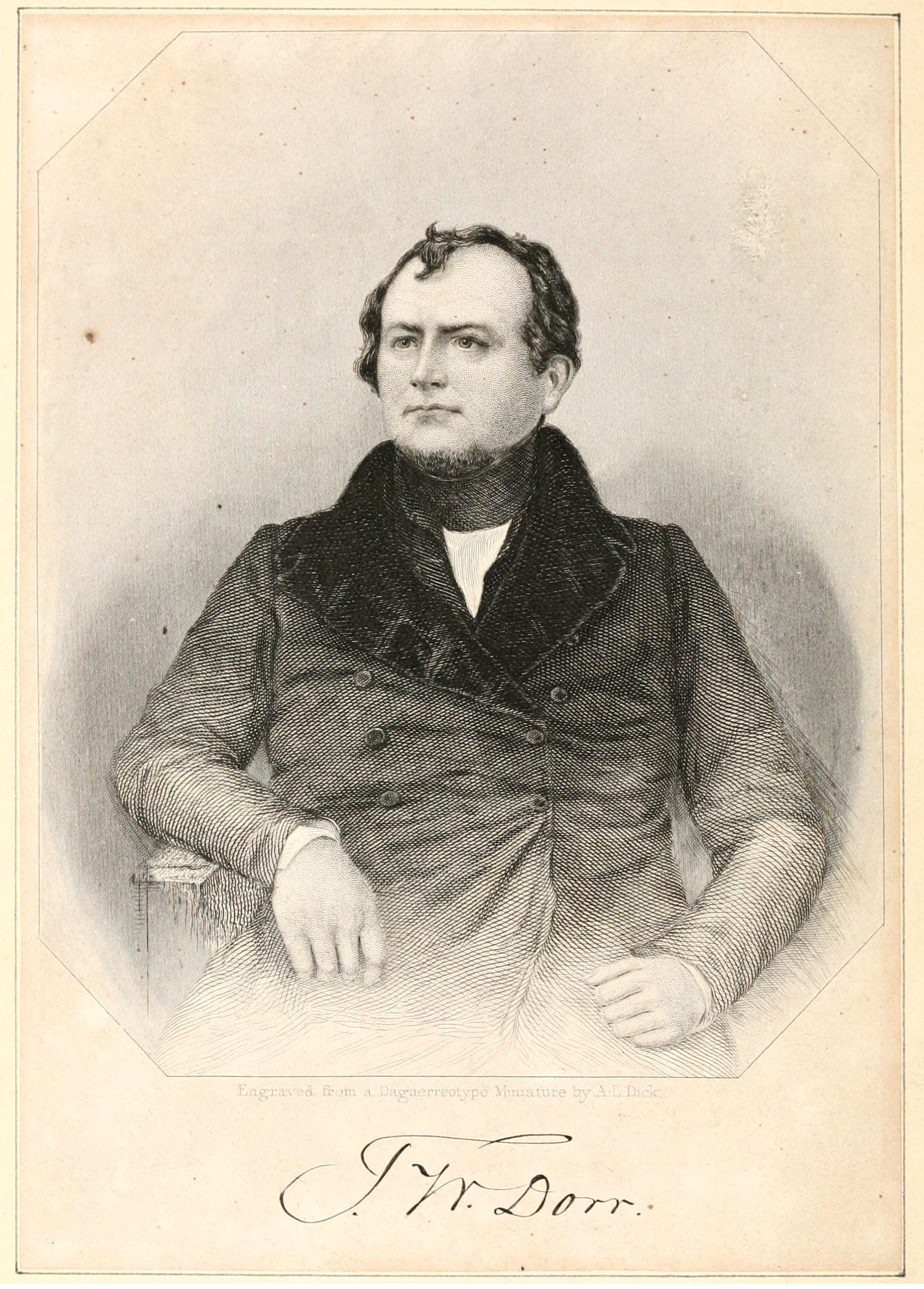
Thomas W. Dorr, leader of the 1842 rebellion, as pictured in an 1844 book frontispiece

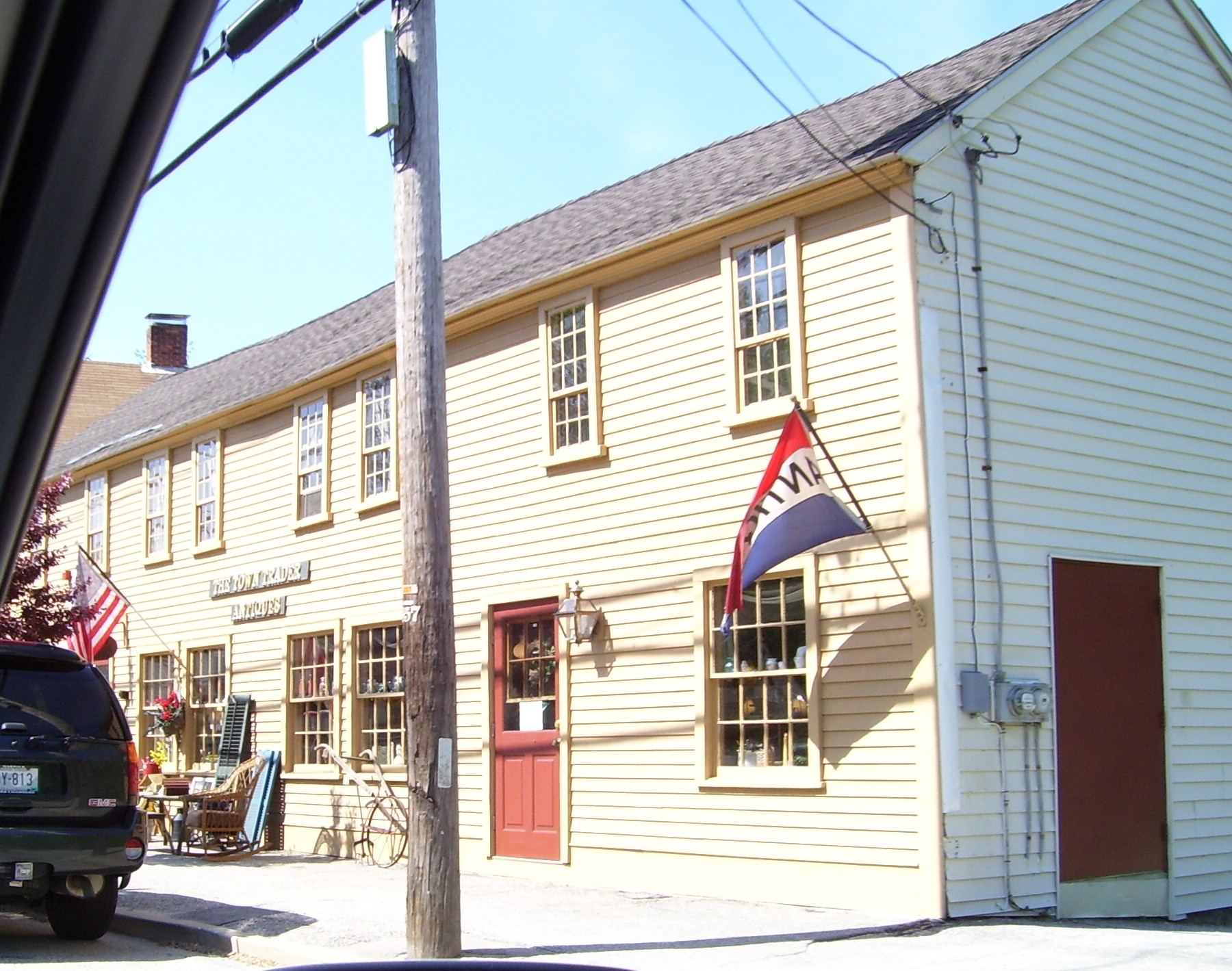
Chepachet antique store

Chepachet Free Baptist Church, c. 1905. The meeting house was built in 1821.

== Demographics ==
=== 2020 census ===
The 2020 United States census counted 1,704 people, 744 households, and 405 families in Chepachet. The population density was 309.4 per square mile (119.4/km^{2}). There were 778 housing units at an average density of 141.2 per square mile (54.5/km^{2}). The racial makeup was 93.19% (1,588) white or European American (92.49% non-Hispanic white), 0.59% (10) black or African-American, 0.12% (2) Native American or Alaska Native, 0.35% (6) Asian, 0.0% (0) Pacific Islander or Native Hawaiian, 0.53% (9) from other races, and 5.22% (89) from two or more races. Hispanic or Latino of any race was 1.88% (32) of the population.

Of the 744 households, 25.1% had children under the age of 18; 46.9% were married couples living together; 25.5% had a female householder with no spouse or partner present. Of households, 31.5% consisted of individuals and 17.7% had someone living alone who was 65 years of age or older. The average household size was 2.6 and the average family size was 3.2. The percent of those with a bachelor’s degree or higher was estimated to be 22.2% of the population.

Of the population, 17.3% was under the age of 18, 6.2% from 18 to 24, 23.5% from 25 to 44, 30.0% from 45 to 64, and 22.9% who were 65 years of age or older. The median age was 47.8 years. For every 100 females, the population had 110.4 males. For every 100 females ages 18 and older, there were 111.1 males.

The 2016–2020 five-year American Community Survey estimates show that the median household income was $80,759 (with a margin of error of ±$16,981) and the median family income was $67,465 (±$28,988). Males had a median income of $56,250 (±$16,409) versus $36,989 (±$10,754) for females. The median income for those above 16 years old was $50,417 (±$17,529). Approximately, 7.4% of families and 10.3% of the population were below the poverty line, including 17.0% of those under the age of 18 and 24.0% of those ages 65 or over.

== Schools ==
The area, part of the town of Glocester, is part of the Foster-Glocester Regional School District, meaning that residents of Chepachet attend Ponaganset Middle School for Lower Secondary Education and Ponaganset High School for higher secondary education. West Glocester Elementary, an elementary school in Chepachet, is part of the Glocester Elementary School District. The regional district has, in the past, reviewed the school mascot of the middle and high school the “Ponaganset Chieftain” as some found it to be discriminatory to the native Nimpuc Native Tribe of the northern Rhode Island region but some believe that the Chieftain empowers students and looks up to the Nimpuc Tribe. It was eventually voted to keep said mascot.

== Notable people ==
- Asa Aldis, Chief Justice of the Vermont Supreme Court
- Phil Paine, Major League Baseball player

== See also ==
- Ancient and Horribles Parade
- National Register of Historic Places listings in Providence County, Rhode Island
