= Normalization of deviance =

Sociological phenomenon

Normalization of deviance, according to American sociologist Diane Vaughan, is the process in which deviance from correct or proper behavior or rule becomes culturally normalized.

Vaughan defines the process where a clearly unsafe practice becomes considered normal if it does not immediately cause a catastrophe: "a long incubation period [before a final disaster] with early warning signs that were either misinterpreted, ignored or missed completely".

The original example cited by Vaughan is the events leading to the Space Shuttle Challenger disaster in 1986, but the concept has also been applied to aviation safety, clinical practice in medicine, and the public's deviance from health measures aimed to stop the COVID-19 pandemic.

Normalization of deviance can exist in conjunction with corporate omerta where deviation from rules is held up by a code of silence surrounding the deviations or an unspoken agreement on rhetoric within a group of executives. One of the reasons Lion Air Flight 610 and Ethiopian Airlines Flight 302 crashed was normalization of deviance enabled by corporate omerta and a "culture of silence".

== See also ==
- Boiling frog
- Groupthink
- Metamodernism
- Overconfidence
- Safety culture
- Shifting baseline
- Workaround
