= Shifting baseline =

Type of change to how a system is measured

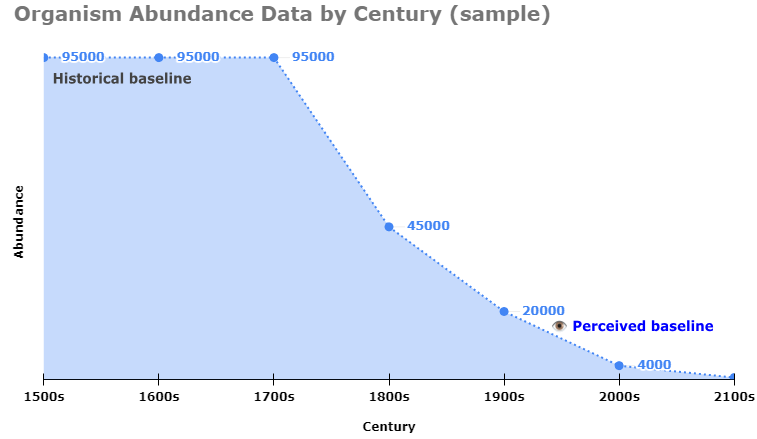
Perceived baseline versus historical baseline of an organism

A shifting baseline (also known as a sliding baseline) is a type of change to how a system is measured, usually against previous reference points (baselines), which themselves may represent significant changes from an even earlier state of the system that fails to be considered or remembered.

The concept arose in landscape architect Ian McHarg's 1969 manifesto Design With Nature in which the modern landscape is compared to that on which ancient people once lived.

The concept was then considered by the fisheries scientist Daniel Pauly in his paper "Anecdotes and the shifting baseline syndrome of fisheries". Pauly developed the concept in reference to fisheries management where fisheries scientists sometimes fail to identify the correct "baseline" population size (e.g. how abundant a fish species population was before human exploitation) and thus, wind up working with a shifted baseline. He describes the way that radically depleted fisheries were evaluated by experts who used the state of the fishery at the start of their careers as the baseline, rather than the fishery in its untouched natural state. Areas that swarmed with a particular species hundreds of years ago, may have experienced long term decline, but it is the level of decades previously that is considered the appropriate reference point for current populations. In this way large declines in ecosystems or species over long periods of time were, and are, masked. There is a loss of perception of change that occurs when each generation redefines what is "natural".

Stock assessments by most modern fisheries do not ignore historical fishing and account for it by either including the historical catch or use other techniques to reconstruct the depletion level of the population at the start of the period for which adequate data is available. Anecdotes about historical population levels may be highly unreliable and result in severe mismanagement of the fishery.

The concept was further refined and applied to the ecology of kelp forests by Paul Dayton and others from the Scripps Institution of Oceanography. They used a slightly different version of the term in their paper, "Sliding baselines, ghosts, and reduced expectations in kelp forest communities". Both terms refer to a shift over time in the expectation of what a healthy ecosystem baseline looks like.

== Broadened meaning ==
In 2002, filmmaker and former marine biologist Randy Olson broadened the definition of shifting baselines with an op-ed in the Los Angeles Times. He explained the relevance of the concept to all aspects of change and the failure to notice change in the world today. He and Jeremy Jackson, a coral reef ecologist, co-founded The Shifting Baselines Ocean Media Project in 2003 to help promote a wider understanding and use of the concept in conservation policy.

The Shifting Baselines Ocean Media Project grew from its three founding partners (Scripps Institution of Oceanography, The Ocean Conservancy, and Surfrider Foundation) to more than twenty conservation groups and science organizations. The project has produced dozens of short films, public service announcements, and Flash videos along with photography, video, and stand-up comedy contests, all intended to promote understanding of the term to a broader audience. The Shifting Baselines Blog, "the cure for planetary amnesia" is run by the Shifting Baselines Ocean Media Project on the Seed (magazine) Science Blogs.

In 2024, Nautilus Quarterly published an article exemplifying that this effect may occur with each human generational advancement when knowledge of changes to nature that have occurred before their personal perceptions, is forgotten or lost and an inaccurate baseline is adopted.

The concept has been broadened further, to apply also to underappreciated, slowly-occurring positive change by Mark Henry who labelled it "Progress Attention Deficit", having the potential for application to both negative and positive differences between incorrectly perceived baselines and accurately perceived baselines.

== See also ==
- Bias of an estimator – Statistical property
- Flynn effect
- Observer bias – Cognitive bias
- Observer-expectancy effect – Cognitive bias of experimental subject
- Overton window – Range of ideas tolerated in public discourse
- Normalization of deviance – Sociological phenomenon
