= First They Came =

Statement and poem by Martin Niemöller

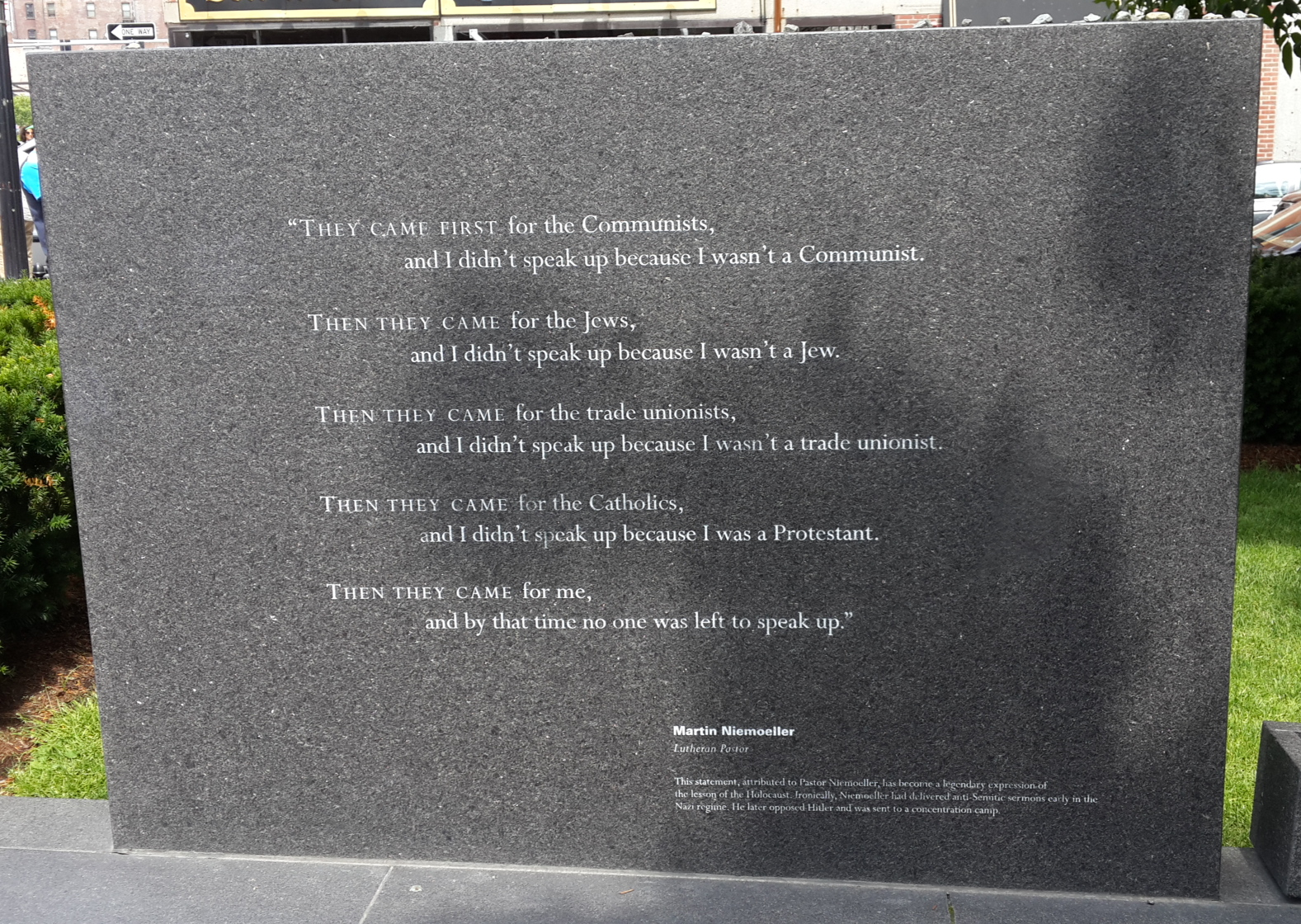
Engraving of the confession in poetic form presented at the New England Holocaust Memorial in Boston, Massachusetts, US

"First They Came" (German: Als sie kamen lit. 'When they came', or Habe ich geschwiegen lit. 'I did not speak out') is the poetic form of a 1946 postwar confessional prose piece by the German Lutheran pastor Martin Niemöller (1892–1984). It indirectly condemns complicity of German intellectuals and clergy following the Nazis' rise to power and subsequent incremental purging of their chosen targets. Many variations and adaptations in the spirit of the original have been published in the English language.

== Text ==
The best-known versions of the confession in English are the edited versions in poetic form that had begun circulating by the 1950s.

A version by the Holocaust Memorial Day Trust, a charity established by the British government, is as follows:

First they came for the Communists
And I did not speak out
Because I was not a Communist

Then they came for the Socialists
And I did not speak out
Because I was not a Socialist

Then they came for the trade unionists
And I did not speak out
Because I was not a trade unionist

Then they came for the Jews
And I did not speak out
Because I was not a Jew

Then they came for me
And there was no one left
To speak out for me

The United States Holocaust Memorial Museum quotes the following text as one of the many poetic versions of the speech:

First they came for the socialists, and I did not speak out—
Because I was not a socialist.

Then they came for the trade unionists, and I did not speak out—
Because I was not a trade unionist.

Then they came for the Jews, and I did not speak out—
Because I was not a Jew.

Then they came for me—and there was no one left to speak for me.

The original German language writing, as preserved at the Martin-Niemöller-Haus Berlin-Dahlem, is as follows:

German text

Als die Nazis die Kommunisten holten,
habe ich geschwiegen; ich war ja kein Kommunist.

Als sie die Gewerkschafter holten, habe ich geschwiegen;
ich war ja kein Gewerkschafter.

Als sie die Sozialdemokraten einsperrten, habe ich geschwiegen;
ich war ja kein Sozialdemokrat.

Als sie die Juden einsperrten, habe ich geschwiegen;
ich war ja kein Jude.

Als sie mich holten, gab es keinen mehr, der protestieren konnte.

English translation

When the Nazis came for the communists,
I kept quiet; I wasn't a communist.

When they came for the trade unionists, I kept quiet;
I wasn't a trade unionist.

When they locked up the social democrats, I kept quiet;
I wasn't a social democrat.

When they locked up the Jews, I kept quiet;
I wasn't a Jew.

When they came for me, there was no one left to protest.

== Author ==
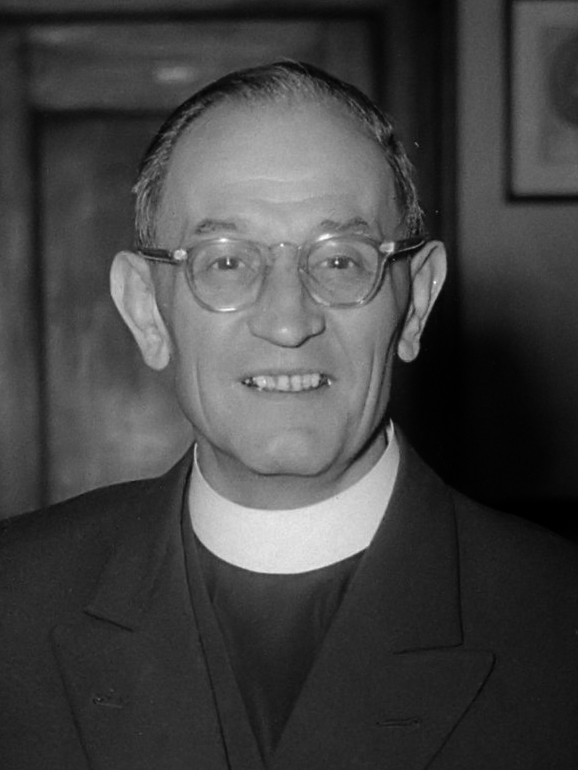
Niemöller at The Hague's Grote Kerk in May 1952

Martin Niemöller was a German Lutheran pastor and theologian born in Lippstadt, Germany, in 1892. Niemöller was initially an anti-Communist, antisemite, and supporter of Adolf Hitler. But when Hitler rose to power and insisted on the supremacy of the state over religion, Niemöller became disillusioned. He became the leader of a group of German clergymen opposed to Hitler.

In 1937 he was arrested and eventually confined in Sachsenhausen and Dachau. He was released in 1945 by the Allies. He continued his career in Germany as a cleric and as a leading voice of penance and reconciliation for the German people after World War II.

== Origin ==
Niemöller made confession in his speech for the Confessing Church in Frankfurt on 6 January 1946, of which there is a partial translation:

"... The people who were put in the camps then were Communists. Who cared about them? We knew it, it was printed in the newspapers. Who raised their voice, maybe the Confessing Church? We thought: Communists, those opponents of religion, those enemies of Christians—"should I be my brother's keeper?"

Then they got rid of the sick, the so-called incurables. I remember a conversation I had with a person who claimed to be a Christian. He said "Perhaps it's right, these incurably sick people just cost the state money, they are just a burden to themselves and to others. Isn't it best for all concerned if they are taken out of the middle [of society]? " Only then did the church as such take note.

Then we started talking, until our voices were again silenced in public. Can we say, we aren't guilty/responsible?

The persecution of the Jews, the way we treated the occupied countries, or the things in Greece, in Poland, in Czechoslovakia or in the Netherlands, that were written in the newspapers. I believe, we Confessing-Church-Christians have every reason to say: mea culpa, mea culpa! We can talk ourselves out of it with the excuse that it would have cost me my head if I had spoken out.

We preferred to keep silent. We are certainly not without fault, and I ask myself again and again, what would have happened, if in the year 1933 or 1934—there must have been a possibility—14,000 Protestant pastors and all Protestant communities in Germany had defended the truth until their deaths? If we had said back then, it is not right when Hermann Göring simply puts 100,000 Communists in the concentration camps, in order to let them die. I can imagine that perhaps 30,000 to 40,000 Protestant Christians would have had their heads cut off, but I can also imagine that we would have rescued 30–40 million people, because that is what it is costing us now."

This speech was translated and published in English in 1947, but was later retracted when it was alleged that Niemöller was an early supporter of the Nazis.

Niemöller is quoted as having used many versions of the text during his career. However, evidence identified by professor Harold Marcuse at the University of California Santa Barbara indicates that:

"In the narrative versions directly traceable to Niemöller he always started with 'the Communists.' He always ended with 'me.' As far as I can tell he always included 'the Jews.' He usually also named Social Democrats and/or trade unionists. In his first invocation in January 1946 he also included disabled people, whom he called 'the sick, so-called incurables'".

Marcuse notes that the version used by the United States Holocaust Memorial Museum is incorrect because it leaves out "the Communists". He traces this version, which has become common in the U.S., to the 1980s, the exclusion of Communists being the result of a continuing culture of anti-communism in the U.S. following the end of the Cold war.

Marcuse also writes that a common variation in Germany, including the "official" version used by the Martin-Niemöller-Stiftung ("Martin Niemöller Foundation"), leaves out Jews; he attributes this to a misinterpretation of an interview Niemöller gave in 1976.

According to Marcuse, "Niemöller's original argument was premised on naming groups he and his audience would instinctively not care about. When his poem is invoked today it is usually to add one's own group to the list of persecuted. That was not a meaning that Niemöller ever wished to convey. The omission of Communists in Washington, and of Jews in Germany, distorts that meaning and should be corrected."

According to Niemöller's biographer Matthew D. Hockenos in a 2025 interview, another possibility is that the well-known poetic form was a contribution to Niemöller.

== Role in Nazi Germany ==
Like many Protestant pastors, Niemöller was a national conservative, and supported the conservative opponents of the Weimar Republic. Thus he welcomed Hitler's accession to power in 1933, believing that it would bring a national revival. By the autumn of 1934, Niemöller joined other Lutheran and Protestant churchmen such as Karl Barth and Dietrich Bonhoeffer in founding the Confessional Church, a Protestant group that opposed the Nazification of the German Protestant churches.

Still, in 1935, Niemöller made pejorative remarks about Jews, while protecting those of Jewish descent who had been baptised in his own church, but were persecuted by the Nazis due to their racial origins. In a sermon in 1935, he said, "What is the reason for [their] obvious punishment, which has lasted for thousands of years? Dear brethren, the reason is easily given: the Jews brought the Christ of God to the cross!"

In 1936, however, he decidedly opposed the Nazis' "Aryan paragraph". Niemöller signed the petition of a group of Protestant churchmen which sharply criticized Nazi policies and declared the Aryan Paragraph incompatible with the Christian virtue of charity. The Nazi regime responded with mass arrests and charges against almost 800 pastors and ecclesiastical lawyers.

After his imprisonment he volunteered to act as a U-boat commander, reprising his role in WWI, but this offer was rejected by the Nazi authorities.

== Usage ==
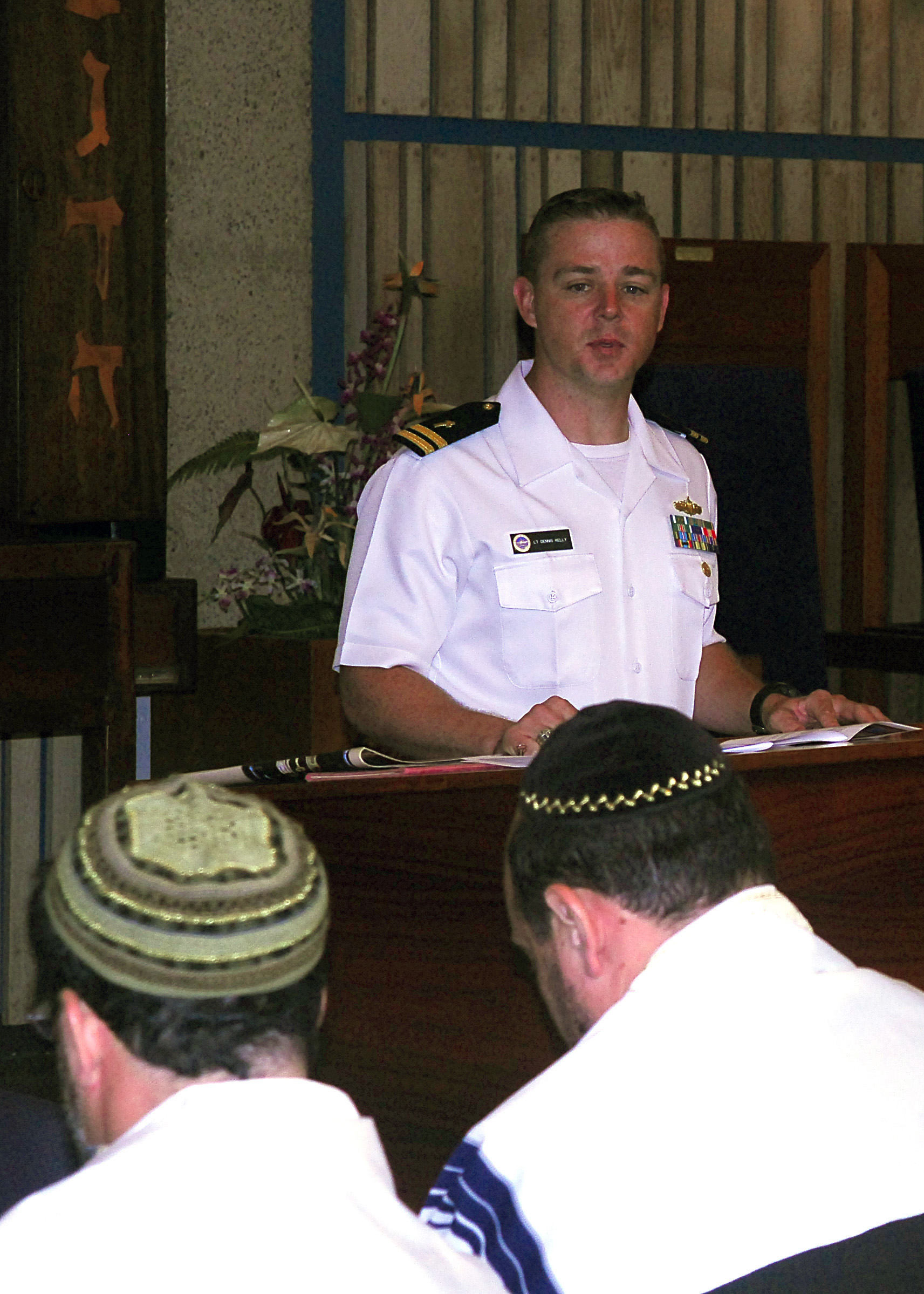
A US Navy chaplain reads an excerpt of Niemöller's poem during a Holocaust Days of Remembrance observance service in Pearl Harbor; 27 April 2009.

At the United States Holocaust Memorial Museum in Washington, D.C., the quotation is prominently featured on a wall as the final display of the museum's permanent exhibition, and the museum website has a discussion of the history of the quotation.

A version of the poem is on display at the Holocaust memorial Yad Vashem in Jerusalem. The poem is also presented at the Virginia Holocaust Museum in Richmond, Virginia; the New England Holocaust Memorial in Boston, Massachusetts; the Florida Holocaust Museum in St. Petersburg, Florida; and the Illinois Holocaust Museum and Education Center in Skokie, Illinois.

Billy Bragg referenced the poem in his song "City of Heroes" about Operation Metro Surge in the US and the protests against it.

== See also ==
- And Then They Came for Me
- The Hangman
- Not My Business
- Then They Came for Me: A Family's Story of Love, Captivity, and Survival
