= Influence: Science and Practice =

Psychology book by Robert Cialdini

Influence: Science and Practice (1985), originally published as Influence: The Psychology of Persuasion (1984), is a psychology book examining the ways people can be influenced by "compliance professionals". The book's author is Robert B. Cialdini, Professor of Psychology at Arizona State University. The main premise of the book is that in a complex world where people are overloaded with more information than they can deal with, people fall back on a decision making approach based on generalizations. According to the book, these generalizations develop because they allow people to usually act in a correct manner with a limited amount of thought and time. However, they can be exploited and effectively turned into weapons by those who know them to influence others to act certain ways. A seventh lever on "unity" has been added to the most recent edition. To date, the book has sold over two million copies and been published in 25 different languages.

The findings in the book are backed up by empirical studies conducted in the fields of psychology, marketing, economics, anthropology and social science.

The author also worked undercover in many compliance fields such as car sales and door-to-door sales.

== Seven principles of influence ==
=== Reciprocation ===
People generally feel obliged to return favors offered to them. This trait is embodied in all human cultures and is one of the human characteristics that allow us to live as a society.

Compliance professionals often play on this trait by offering a small gift to potential customers. Studies have shown that even if the gift is unwanted, it will influence the recipient to reciprocate.

A variation on this theme, known as the "door-in-the-face technique", is to ask for a particularly big favor. When this is turned down, a smaller favor is asked for. This is likely to be successful because a concession on one side (the down-scaling of the favor) will be reciprocated by a concession by the other party (agreement to the smaller favor).

Reciprocation is an application of reciprocity.

=== Commitment and consistency ===
People have a general desire to appear consistent in their behavior. People generally also value consistency in others.

Compliance professionals can exploit the desire to be consistent by having someone make an initial, often small, commitment, known as the "foot-in-the-door technique". Requests can then be made that are in keeping with this initial commitment.

People also have a strong desire to stand by commitments made by providing further justification and reasons for supporting them. Compliance professionals exploit this with the so-called "low-ball" technique, where buyers agree to an attractive offer before it is altered to be less favorable to them and more profitable to the seller. This pattern of behavior toward or resulting in a negative outcome is called escalation of commitment.

=== Social proof ===
People generally look to other people similar to themselves when making decisions. This is particularly noticeable in situations of uncertainty or ambiguity.

This trait has led compliance professionals to provide fake information on what others are doing. Examples of this are staged interviews on television advertisements or "infomercials".

=== Liking ===
People are more likely to agree to offers from people whom they like. There are several factors that can influence people to like some people more than others:

- Physical attractiveness can give people a halo effect whereby others are more likely to trust them and to think of them as smarter and more talented.
- People tend to like people who are most like themselves.
- People tend to like those who pay them compliments.
- People who they are forced to cooperate with to achieve a common goal tend to form a trust with those people.
- People tend to like people that make them laugh. For example, many lectures start with a joke.

Any one of the above methods may not help influence people, but used in combination, their effects can be magnified.

=== Authority ===
The Milgram experiment run by Stanley Milgram provided insights into how influential authority can be over others.

People often react in an automated fashion to commands from authority and even to symbols of authority (such as academic degrees, uniforms, expensive cars, etc.), even when their instincts suggest the commands should not be followed.

=== Scarcity ===
People tend to want things as they become less available. This has led advertisers to promote goods as having "limited availability", or "short time only".

It has also been shown that when information is restricted (such as through censorship), people want the information more and will hold that information in higher regard.

Items are also given a higher value when they were once in high supply but have now become scarce.

=== Unity ===
According to this principle, added after the other six, people value being part of a team or group. Used in a negative way, it can create an "Us vs. Them" mentality. Used in a positive way, it can make people feel that they are part of a group in which everyone looks out for one another.
