= Door-in-the-face technique =

Starting with an unreasonable offer to make the next one more appealing

The door-in-the-face technique is a compliance method commonly studied in social psychology. The persuader attempts to convince the respondent to comply by making a large request that the respondent will most likely turn down, much like a metaphorical slamming of a door in the persuader's face. The respondent is then more likely to agree to a second, more reasonable request, than if that same request is made in isolation. The DITF technique can be contrasted with the foot-in-the-door (FITD) technique, in which a persuader begins with a small request and gradually increases the demands of each request. Both the FITD and DITF techniques increase the likelihood a respondent will agree to the second request. The door-in-the-face technique was tested in a 1975 study conducted by Robert Cialdini.

== Classic experiment ==
In a classic experiment investigating the effectiveness of the DITF technique, researchers separated participants into three groups. In group 1, experimenters asked participants to volunteer to counsel juvenile delinquents for two hours a week for two years (large request). After their refusal, the group was asked to chaperone juvenile delinquents on a one-day trip to the zoo (small request). Group 2 was given only the small request. In group 3, the experimenter described the large request but asked the participants to perform the small request. 50% of the participants in group 1 agreed to the small request, compared to 17% in group 2 and 25% in group 3. Because compliance for the small request was significantly larger for group 1 than group 2, the DITF technique was successful. Compliance for the small request was also significantly larger for group 1 than group 3, which demonstrates that mere exposure to the more extreme task does not affect compliance as significantly.

A 2020 study published in the Journal of Personality and Social Psychology replicated the findings of Cialdini's original 1975 experiment.

== Mechanisms ==
An important topic in DITF research involves whether the DITF technique is effective because of reciprocal concessions or social responsibility. The reciprocal concessions explanation is more common and involves reciprocity, or the need for a respondent to comply to the smaller second request because the persuader is compromising from the initial request. The social responsibility explanation involves internal standards of the importance of helping others that make the respondent feel they must comply to the second smaller request. Other explanations of the DITF effect involve maintaining a positive self-presentation and reducing guilt.

=== Reciprocal concessions and social responsibility ===
==== Support for social responsibility ====
Two studies comparing reciprocal concessions with social responsibility explanations found evidence for social responsibility related to helping. In the first study, participants read DITF scenarios and then rated whether certain terms were relevant to these situations or not. These terms either referred to helping or to bargaining. In the second study, participants rated the similarity of a DITF interaction to four other situations: helping a friend, negotiating with a friend, helping a stranger, and negotiating with a stranger. The DITF scenarios used in both studies were taken from previous research and shown to be very effective in influencing compliance. Overall, findings indicate that participants felt DITF interactions were more closely related to helping than bargaining. This supports the social responsibility explanation of the DITF technique because social responsibility is related to helping one's self, while reciprocal concessions is related to negotiating.

==== Support for both social responsibility and reciprocal concessions ====
Research investigating reciprocal concessions and in-group-out-group biases found both reciprocal concessions and in-group context to be important in the DITF technique. In-groups are groups that a person feels that they belong to, while out-groups are ones that a person does not belong to and might perceive negatively. This study employed two different types of confederates, in-group confederates who dressed and acted like college students and out-group confederates who dressed and acted more formally. The in-group confederates introduced themselves as university students, while the out-group confederates introduced themselves as private business school students. All of the participants in this study went to the same university as the in-group confederates. The confederates either made a large request then a smaller one, a smaller request alone, or offered the participant a choice of both requests. Results show greater compliance to the second smaller request for the in-group confederates compared to out-group confederates, but there was still a DITF effect in the out-group context. Participants were most likely to comply to requests from those within their social groups, yet they still had increased compliance to the smaller second request for people outside of their social groups. The researchers suggest that this is evidence for reciprocal concessions because the influence of social group and the DITF effect work independently of each other, therefore, there must be another explanation for DITF that does not involve in-group-out-group biases. The researchers fail to mention the social responsibility explanation, however.

==== Sufficiency of explanations ====
Another study comparing reciprocal concessions with social responsibility found neither explanation to be sufficient. This study employed confederates who asked for donations door-to-door. Participants were either given a large, moderate, or small request initially. The large request involved 10 hours of volunteering for several weeks, the moderate request involved a $30.00 donation, and the small request involved a donation of any amount. The confederate gave the smaller request after an initial large or moderate one. Participants then filled out a questionnaire that asked about the respondent's perceived obligation to comply, perceptions of negotiation and/or helping in the situation, and whether the respondent was friends with the confederate. Results show that participants were more likely to comply for friends than strangers, the DITF technique had greater compliance overall than a small request alone, and the DITF technique had larger increases in compliance for strangers. Findings regarding social responsibility and reciprocal concessions were inconclusive, with high correlations between perceptions of negotiation and guilt as well as guilt and obligation. The researchers suggest that both of the explanations work together in the DITF effect.

=== Self-presentation ===
In a similar study looking at differences between friends and strangers using the DITF technique, the DITF technique was more effective in increasing compliance for friends than strangers, which is contrary to other research findings. The researcher explains the results as evidence for the importance of self-presentation when friends use the DITF technique. They suggest that the respondents' need to present themselves well to their friends motivates compliance to the second request.

=== Guilt reduction ===
Research on the influence of guilt indicates that it plays an important role in the effectiveness of the DITF technique. Participants began the study by filling out a questionnaire related to demographics and health. The experimenter then told the participant he or she was finished with the experiment. As the participant was leaving, the experimenter asked the participant to record meals for the next three months as a part of a larger study on health. After refusal, the experimenter then made a second smaller request for the participant to record their meals for four days. There was a control condition that only received the second smaller request. Participants were assigned to one of four groups: high guilt induction and high guilt reduction, high guilt induction and low guilt reduction, low guilt induction and high guilt reduction, and low guilt induction and low guilt reduction. The high guilt induction statement indicated that the rejection of the first request would have negative effects on the study, while the low guilt induction statement indicated that the rejection of the first request would not really have negative effects on the study. The high guilt reduction statement indicated that the second request would be equally helpful as the first, while the low guilt reduction statement indicated that the second request would not be as helpful as the first. Researchers measured both verbal and behavioral compliance to the smaller second request. Findings indicate a significant increase in both types of compliance for the high guilt induction, high guilt reduction condition. There was no DITF effect for the other conditions because compliance to the second request was the same as compliance for the control condition. According to the researcher, this suggests that guilt is the sole explanation for the effectiveness of the DITF technique.

== Recent research ==
=== Metacommunication ===
In a study looking at the DITF technique, researchers found that DITF requests that required metacommunication in the responses had higher rates of compliance than requests that did not. The researchers define metacommunication as establishing social boundaries. This is important because the DITF technique often involves strangers making extreme requests, which might elicit a response that requires metacommunication. For example, a person may use metacommunication to indicate that it is inappropriate that a stranger make such an extreme request. This study included four different groups: one starting with a large request and including a metacommunicative statement, one starting with a large request and excluding a metacommunicative statement, one with only a smaller request and including a metacommunicative statement, and one with only a smaller request and excluding a metacommunicative statement. For all of the groups a confederate asked participants to fill out a questionnaire about campus activities. The large request required a few hours, while the smaller one required 20 minutes. In the groups that started with a large request, the confederate followed up with the smaller one after a refusal. The requests with metacommunication included a sentence stating, "This is kind of awkward. There is something else I'd like to ask of you, but tell me if even this seems inappropriate between strangers" prior to filling out the 20-minute questionnaire (p. 92). Results show significantly greater compliance to requests that included the metacommunicative statement. The researchers suggest that the explicit statement regarding social boundaries makes participants comply to avoid engaging in metacommunicative conflict.

=== Reverse psychology ===
Research investigating reverse psychology showed that participants used the DITF technique in their everyday lives. They also use other reverse psychology tactics, such as FITD. There were two studies that looked at participants' own experiences using reverse psychology, which these researchers refer to as strategic self-anticonformity. The first study consisted of an open-ended questionnaire that asked participants about instances in which they used strategic self-anticonformity. The second study asked about specific instances of different types of strategic self-anti-conformity, like DITF and FITD. Findings indicate that most of the participants could provide examples of their own use of reverse psychology tactics and that a likely explanation for this is a need for social reassurance.

=== Monetary solicitation ===
A study looking at behavioral, not just verbal, compliance to donate money found that the DITF technique was effective. The study involved male and female confederates who ordered lemonade at a restaurant and engaged in conversation before the male announced loudly that he was leaving to buy a part for his bicycle. After he left the female confederate expressed aloud that the male did not pay and asked the participant sitting near her to pay the total bill. In the DITF condition, the female confederate asked if the participant would pay part of the bill after a refusal to pay the total bill from every participant. In the control condition the female confederate only made the second smaller request. The DITF technique yielded significantly more behavioral compliance than the control, which shows that the DITF technique works for more than just verbal agreement.

=== Retail ===
A study looking at the DITF technique in retail found that it was very effective in increasing sales. In this study the experimenter sold cheese to people walking past a hut in the Austrian Alps. The experimenter rotated between five conditions: a DITF condition in which the experimenter first tried to sell two pounds of cheese at eight euros and then one pound of cheese at four euros, a DITF condition with an emphasis on concession in which the experimenter said that two pounds was probably too much anyway, a DITF condition with an emphasis on credibility of the experimenter, who wore traditional clothes and spoke in a mountain dialect, a DITF condition with both an emphasis on concession and credibility, and a control condition in which the experimenter only made the smaller second request. Results show increased compliance for the second request in all of the DITF conditions compared to the control. The DITF condition with an emphasis on concession and credibility had the largest increase in compliance. The researchers suggest that the DITF technique could be useful in other retail settings.

Researchers investigated the DITF technique in a restaurant setting and found that it is effective if there is no delay between the first and second requests. Waitresses were instructed to ask randomly selected restaurant patrons whether they wanted dessert at the end of their meals. If the participant refused, the waitress then either immediately asked if the participant wanted tea or coffee or waited three minutes to ask. Findings indicate increased compliance to the second request for the immediate condition but not the delayed one. The researchers suggest that these results have significant implications for the restaurant industry, particularly the importance of servers' timing when the restaurant is busy.

=== Academics ===
In a study looking at compliance techniques for children to complete academic work, researchers found that the DITF technique was most effective. The study had three groups of 2nd grade participants: the FITD, DITF, and control groups. The FITD group was asked by one teacher to do an easy 15-question worksheet and then asked 15 minutes later by another teacher to complete a 20-question worksheet. The DITF group was initially asked to complete a 100-question worksheet. After refusal, the group was asked to do 20 of the questions. The control group was asked to complete a 20-question worksheet. The researchers looked at compliance as well as students' mathematical ability, quality of work, and amount of help needed. Results show that the DITF technique was effective in increasing compliance rates compared to the FITD and control conditions. The DITF group also needed less adult help to complete the worksheet. Overall, the researchers suggest that DITF can be a useful technique to get students to do their academic work.

=== Technology ===
Research on the DITF effect in internet fundraising indicates that the DITF technique works in an electronic context. This study looked at donations for children victims of mine injuries. The homepage of the website provided pictures of children with injuries. In the control condition, the homepage asked for donations and redirected participants to a page with a picture and several links to outside charitable organizations. In the DITF condition, the homepage asked participants to help the children in the photographs. The link redirected participants to a page that asked them to spend several hours a week finding people to donate to the site. There were links to respond to the question on the page. After a refusal, the participants were redirected to the same page as the control group, which had links to outside charities. The researcher measured numbers of clicks on these links, not actual donations. Results show that participants in the DITF condition were more willing to click on the outside links than those in the control condition. The researcher highlights that these results indicate DITF technique can be effective in electronic contexts.

In a study investigating the effectiveness of the FITD and DITF techniques in a virtual world, researchers found that both techniques worked to increase compliance. The study occurred in a virtual world called "There.com", where users create avatars to interact with other users' avatars. In the DITF condition, the experimenter approached another user's avatar and asked for a moderate request, which involved taking a screenshot of 50 different locations. After refusal, the experimenter gave the smaller request, which was to take one screenshot. In the FITD condition, the experimenter started with the smaller request and then gave the moderate one. The control condition involved only the smaller request. For half of the participants, the experimenter's avatar was dark-skinned and for the other half the avatar was light-skinned. Findings indicate that both the FITD and DITF techniques increased compliance to the second request compared to the control condition, although the DITF technique was less effective for the dark-skinned avatar. There was no skin color effect for the FITD condition. The researchers suggest that these results illustrate social carryover from real-life to the virtual world.

== DITF vs. FITD ==
A meta-analysis of findings from 22 studies comparing the DITF and FITD techniques indicated that there were no significant differences in effectiveness of the two techniques. Overall, they both produced similar rates of compliance across many studies that employed comparable target requests.

=== Combining DITF and FITD ===
In a set of studies about compliance methods, the researcher found evidence for the effectiveness of the "foot-in-the-face" (FITF) technique, which combines the DITF and FITD techniques. The FITF technique involves two moderately difficult requests that are equally demanding.

Study 1: Confederates asked one group of participants to read temperature and another to read air pressure. Regardless of whether the participants complied with the first request, they were given a second one. One group read temperature first and the other air pressure. Results show that participants were more likely to agree to the second request following the first than the second request in isolation, regardless of whether it was to read the temperature or air pressure. There were participants who complied with both requests, but there were also participants who complied to the second, but not the first request.

Study 2: This study was very similar to the first, except one group was given the second request immediately after the first, while another group was given the second request two to three days after the first. The requests were to complete a questionnaire or to tape record a section out of a book. Findings indicate that the delay between requests was more effective for participants who complied to the first request, while the immediate request was more effective for those who rejected the first request.

Study 3: This study used the same requests from the study 2. Confederates made the second request immediately to participants who rejected the first but waited two to three days for those who complied with the first request. Results show that overall there was significantly greater compliance to the second request and that participants who agreed to the first were more likely to agree to the second than those who rejected the initial request.

These three studies provide evidence to support the effectiveness of the FITD technique because it increased compliance in all three experiments. The researcher suggests that the FITD technique may be preferable to DITF because it does not place as much pressure on people to comply.

== See also ==
- Foot-in-the-door technique – Compliance tactic
- Ambit claim – Negotiation technique
- Bait-and-switch – Form of fraud
- Compliance (psychology) – Submission to a request
- Framing effect (psychology) – Bias in which choices are influenced by the options' connotations
- Low-ball – Negotiation technique
- Overton window – Range of ideas tolerated in public discourse
