= Basking in reflected glory =

Term in cognitive studies

Basking in reflected glory (BIRGing) is a self-serving cognition whereby an individual associates themselves with known successful others such that the winner's success becomes the individual's own accomplishment. The affiliation of another's success is enough to stimulate self-glory. The individual does not need to be personally involved in the successful action. To BIRG, they must simply associate themselves with the success. Examples of BIRGing include anything from sharing a home state with a past or present famous person, to religious affiliations, to sports teams. For example, when a fan of a football team wears the team's jersey and boasts after a win, this fan is engaging in BIRGing. A parent with a bumper sticker reading "My child is an honor student" is basking in the reflected glory of their child. While many people have anecdotal accounts of BIRGing, social psychologists seek to find experimental investigations delving into BIRGing. Within social psychology, BIRGing is thought to enhance self-esteem and to be a component of self-management.

BIRGing has connections to social identity theory, which explains how self-esteem and self-evaluation can be enhanced by the identification with another person's success through basking in reflected glory that is not earned. Social identity is the individual's self-concept derived from perceived membership of social groups. High self-esteem is typically a perception of oneself as attractive, competent, likeable, and a morally good person. The perception of having these attributes makes the person feel as if they are more attractive to the outside social world and thus more desirable to others.

BIRGing is a widespread and important impression management technique to counter any threats to self-esteem and to maintain positive relations with others. Some positive effects of BIRGing include increasing individual self-esteem and a sense of accomplishment. It can show pride of self, and pride for the other person's success, which in turn boosts one's own self-esteem. BIRGing can be negative when done over-extensively where the individual engaging in BIRGing becomes delusional or forgets the reality that they did not actually accomplish the successful event.

A related concept is cutting off reflected failure (CORFing). This is the idea that people tend to disassociate themselves from lower-status individuals because they do not want their reputations affected by associating with the people who are considered failures.

== Empirical findings ==
One of the most influential studies of this phenomenon was done by Robert Cialdini in 1976, known as The Three (Football) Field Study. He discovered that the students sought to have the success of their football team linked to them by wearing school-identified apparel. These students associated themselves with a success, even though they in no way affected or caused the success. Through three different experiments, Cialdini was able to demonstrate the BIRGing phenomenon. The first experiment demonstrated BIRGing by showing that students have a greater tendency to wear apparel with the university's colors and name after the football team had won a game. In the second experiment, subjects used the pronoun "we" to associate themselves more with a positive than a negative source. This was shown most prominently when their public reputation was at risk. When the subjects failed a task, they had a greater tendency to affiliate themselves with a winner, and less of a tendency to associate themselves with a loser. The third experiment replicated the finding that students used the pronoun "we" more when describing a victory compared to a non-victory by their school's football team. The researchers found that BIRGing is an attempt to enhance one's public image. The tendency to proclaim a connection with a positive source was strongest when one's public image was threatened. Thus, people bask in reflected glory to boost their self-esteem by associating themselves with a positive source.

A feeling of involvement is also necessary for BIRGing to occur. It is frequently seen as a cognitive process that affects behavior. In Bernhardt et al.'s study published in 1998, researchers examined physiological processes related to BIRGing, specifically, changes in the production of endocrine hormones. Fans watched their favorite sports teams (basketball and soccer) win or lose. The men's testosterone levels increased while watching their team win, but decreased while watching their team lose. Thus, this study shows that physiological processes may be involved with BIRGing, in addition to the known changes in self-esteem and cognition.

The mirror image of BIRGing is cutting off reflected failure (CORFing). This is the idea that people tend to disassociate themselves from lower-status individuals because they do not want their reputations affected by associating with the people who are considered failures. In 2002, Boen et al. demonstrated this effect in a political context. They examined houses with at least a poster or lawn sign supporting a political candidate days before elections in Belgium. The houses that showed support for the winning candidate displayed their posters and lawn signs for a longer period after the elections than did those who supported the loser. CORFing behavior was studied in basketball fans after a defeat, where the fans refuse to take a team poster, removed their posters or paraphernalia, avoided other fans and stayed in a bad mood after a defeat. Thus, the tendency for individuals to display their association with a successful source and to conceal their association with an unsuccessful one was empirically supported.

These empirical studies show how even in controlled situations, people unconsciously seek acceptance by associating themselves with successful individuals. Whether this is accomplished by wearing brand names or parents covering their car with stickers about how talented their child is, BIRGing has been found in both the naturalistic and experimental setting.

== Major theoretical approaches ==
Although Cialdini's studies introduced the concept of BIRGing to the public and its relevance to social psychology, an operational definition is quite difficult to form. With such a wide range of possible examples, there is no set criteria by which to clearly recognize BIRGing. Rather, by a classical definition, it is more described as a subjective feeling possessed by one individual who seeks to gain acceptance or respect by associating themselves with the successes of others. However, over recent years, advances in technology (among other domains) have challenged the classic definition of BIRGing. For example, when Apple Computers became very successful, many individuals not only purchased Apple products, but many more sought jobs or other associations with the company. Contemporary BIRGing in today's world can be seen by individuals not only associating themselves with the success of other people or groups, as was originally thought by Cialdini and others, but also with companies, businesses, or activities that are perceived as popular or highly regarded.

Facebook, Twitter, and other social networking sites have increased BIRGing with popular brands, as it allows everyone to post their affinity for or their associations with popular companies, media, businesses, etc. Furthermore, the ability for everyone to follow their favorite athletes, actors, etc. on Facebook or Twitter allows for a closer connection to and knowledge of these celebrities, therefore leading to more BIRGing. Thus, the spread of technology has not only increased the realms under which BIRGing may fall, but also increased the ease with which individuals may partake in BIRGing.

Psychological approaches to BIRGing would include Ludwig Lewisohn's behavioral approach, Charles Darwin's evolutionary approach, and to some extent even Sigmund Freud's psychodynamic approach. The behavioral approach is relevant to BIRGing as it analyzes the behavior and success of others. If one partakes in observing this behavior, they can learn which actions and people are successful or popular and can then engage in BIRGing by associating themselves with these actions or people. Darwin's evolutionary approach can also be used to analyze BIRGing due to the idea behind survival of the fittest. In contemporary psychology, survival of the fittest applies to achieving the greatest successes possible in order to ensure the passage of one's genes into future generations. From this biological perspective, it is favorable to be popular and respected, as more mating opportunities will present themselves. This can be seen in BIRGing as individuals associate themselves with popular, attractive, or respected actions and people in order to be perceived as having more successes. Freud's psychodynamic theory can be applied to BIRGing in terms of the super ego's relationship to the ego. The super ego refers to the ideal self-image; it constitutes a view of one's self as perfect. The ego refers to the real self, meaning our consciousness and perceptions of our current selves. Thus, if an individual seeks to gain more respect or popularity, the super ego may lead to BIRGing, as that individual will associate themselves with popular and respected entities in order to increase that individual's notion of ego.

== Role of deindividuation ==
Another equally important contributing influence is deindividuation, a psychological state characterized by partial or complete loss of self-awareness, diffused responsibility, and decreased concern about our own behavior. Often results in the abandonment of norms, restraints and inhibitions due to the involvement in a group. The individual loses their sense of self as they participate in the group's activities and choices. Deindividuation involves a loss of self-awareness, resulting in comparisons against meaningful standards. When spectators become deindividuated, their self-awareness decreases and they cease to compare their behavior against these social norms. The group's norms become their only focus, and therefore the social norms. Consequentially, situational forces are more influential. Without the comparison process of self-awareness, behavior is more likely to be inconsistent with attitude.

== Applications ==
BIRGing is a common aspect of everyday life. Anecdotal evidence explains how people make connections with highly positive or successful people. States and cities list the names of famous entertainers, political candidates, beauty contest winners, etc. who were born there. In encounters with a successful individual or famous celebrity, one may recount the story several times in order to bask in the glory because one has a sense of pride after meeting such an individual. People associate with certain companies and schools in order to establish a connection to individuals or groups that represent these organizations. Humans are always trying to regulate their self-esteem, so they continually engage in BIRGing.

Extra real-world examples:

- Bragging about a famous relative (e.g., "my great, great, great grandfather was U.S. President Abraham Lincoln's cousin")
- School/Accomplishment car decal in terms of adding a "bumper sticker" (e.g., "Vanderbilt University" or "My son is an Eagle Scout")
- Wearing a team jersey after they win (e.g., Wearing a Green Bay Packers jersey after the 2011 Super Bowl or wearing Seahawks paraphernalia during and after they win a game)

== Sports ==
=== Nationalism ===
Nationalism relates heavily to the idea of BIRGing in events like the FIFA World Cup and Olympic Games. Members of each country unite in support of the athletes who wear their flag during competitions. This is the prime opportunity for citizens of each country to represent their heritage through those competing. Throughout the year, a person may be less inclined to watch "unusual sports", but as the entire world invests in the Olympics, it gives those an opportunity to tune in for the sake of their countries. While nationalism is still prevalent, it is more noticeable through their supporters after that country wins or earns a medal.

=== Fantasy sports ===
While the concept of BIRGing has been connected to sports fandom for decades, the phenomena in fantasy sports has only been studied in recent years. A 2014 study discovered that fantasy football players had similar social-psychological reactions to fans of traditional teams. Due to the nature of fantasy football being a more involved fan experience, these effects have even been found to be heightened. Because they feel more responsible for wins and losses: they are more likely to engage in discussion or football media if their fantasy team wins, and less likely to do so if their team loses.

=== Identity and gender ===
==== Significance of pronoun usage ====
Pronouns play a significant role in BIRGing and CORFing and can help distinguish the two behaviors instantly.

When someone is basking in reflected glory, they often use the pronouns "We" or "Us", insinuating that they contributed and are a part of the success. Inversely, when someone is cutting off reflected failure, they switch to using "They" or "Them", separating themselves from the failure at large. These vernacular choices rely heavily on the success of the team/program and are rooted in our societal identities.

=== Male vs female differences ===
Author John S.W Spinda conducted research studying the differences between how males and females react to their NFL team's outcomes. After extensive research, he concluded that the ideas of BIRGing and CORFing are two separate constructs that each had their own separate dimensions. " The overall BIRGing construct included two subscales; basking communication and communication disinhibition. The overall CORFing construct included four subscales; display avoidance, media avoidance, online team distancing, and communication suppression."

From the study:

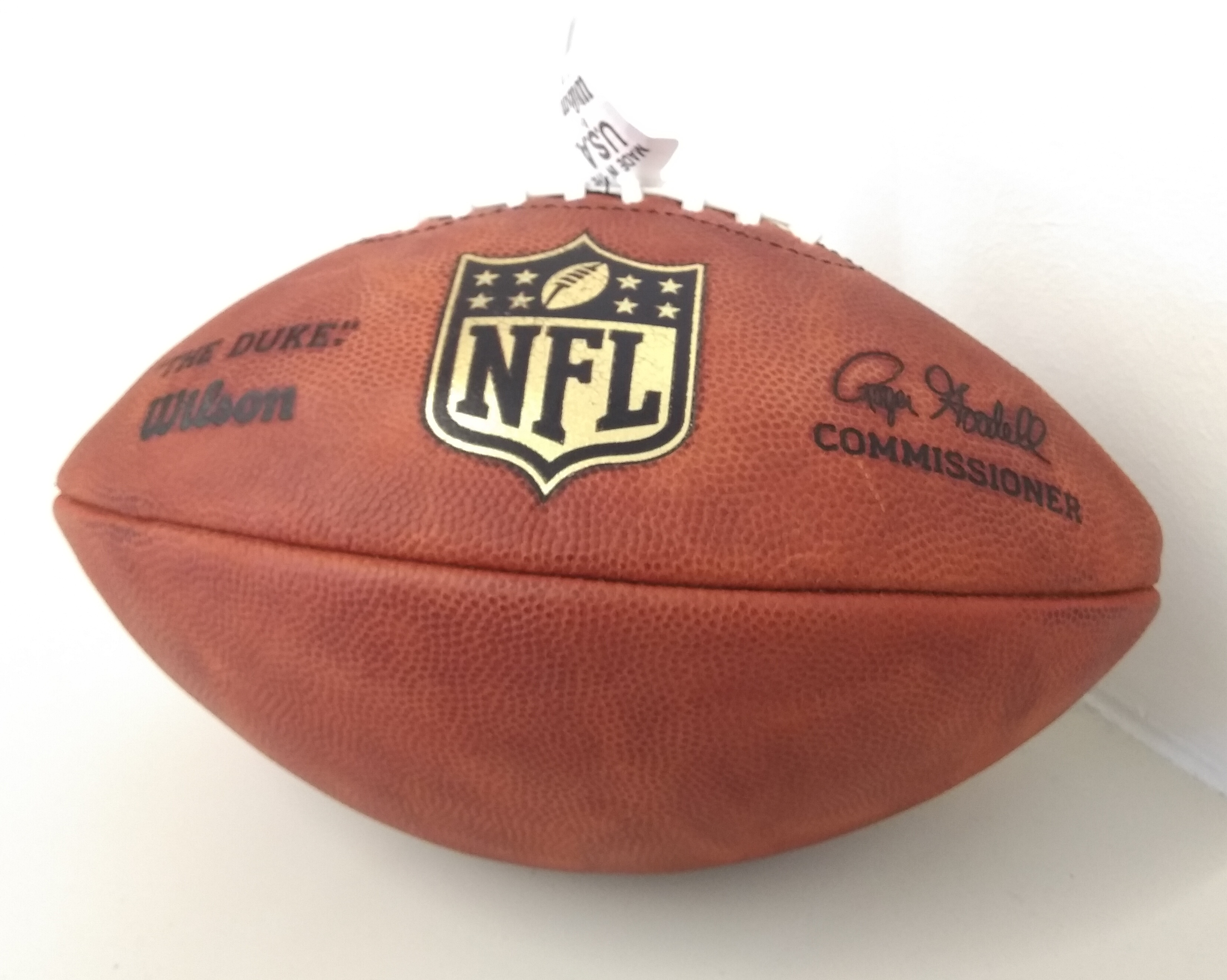

However, when male and female participants were separately analyzed, noteworthy differences were found in both the BIRGing and CORFing constructs. In regards to BIRGing, female NFL fans employed a large cluster of basking communication activities that stabilized into one large factor. These included seeking out mediated enjoyment (e.g., highlights, news stories), contacting others by using the internet, the phone, or by spending time with family or close others, and by displaying team logos, emblems, or insignias to others (i.e., displaying team). Additionally, female NFL fans exhibited communication disinhibition by "talking trash" to other fans that have experienced defeat or are not performing as well as their favorite team. Meanwhile, male NFL fans isolated many of these celebratory behaviors into four smaller factors; displaying team, mediated enjoyment, communication disinhibition, and online team support.

Conversely, CORFing among female NFL fans was evident in three factors. First, communication avoidance included subduing "trash talk" to fans of more successful teams (i.e., communication suppression), refraining from posting messages online to support the team (i.e., online team distancing) and being less likely to call fellow fans on the phone. Second, display avoidance was exhibited by female NFL fans after a loss. Third, female NFL fans tended to isolate themselves from losing outcomes by avoiding not only mediated reminders of the defeat, but also by avoiding their family or close others after a defeat. Male NFL fans in this study demonstrated CORFing through four factors that paralleled the male BIRGing factors; display avoidance, media avoidance, communication suppression, and online team distancing.

== Controversies ==
BIRGing is a widely used theoretical construct in the field of social psychology. However, it is difficult to define and operationalize BIRGing (discussed in "Major Theoretical Approaches"). Because examples of BIRGing are so different and unique, there is no set criterion. The classical definition of BIRGing describes it as a subjective feeling possessed by one individual who seeks to gain acceptance or respect by associating themselves with the successes of others. However, in recent years changes in culture and industry have challenged this classic definition. With these changes, people are not only associating with other people, but also with companies, brands, and organizations.

== Limitations ==
Limitations that apply to both BIRGing and CORFing are perceptions and expectations about performance and how they have an impact. Many scholars have found that the confirmation and disconfirmation of the expected victory or loss has a significant effect on BIRGing and CORFing. For example, if one predicts that one's favorite team is going to lose, one is less likely to be afraid to associate with that team because they predicted the loss. This supports that a person is more likely to participate in BIRGing or CORFing if their public image is threatened. In addition, most studies only test for the identification with one favorite team, whereas individuals may have multiple favorite teams. Whether having multiple favorite teams increases the occurrences of BIRGing could be investigated further.

A study published by Spinda in 2011 found significant differences between those identifying as male and female in BIRGing and CORFing. However, a study by Ware and Kowalski did not find significant differences among sports fans based on gender, though it found males were more likely to identify as die-hard fans.

== See also ==
- Persuasion
- Cult of personality
- Social dominance orientation
