= Media manipulation =

Techniques in which partisans create an image that favours their interests

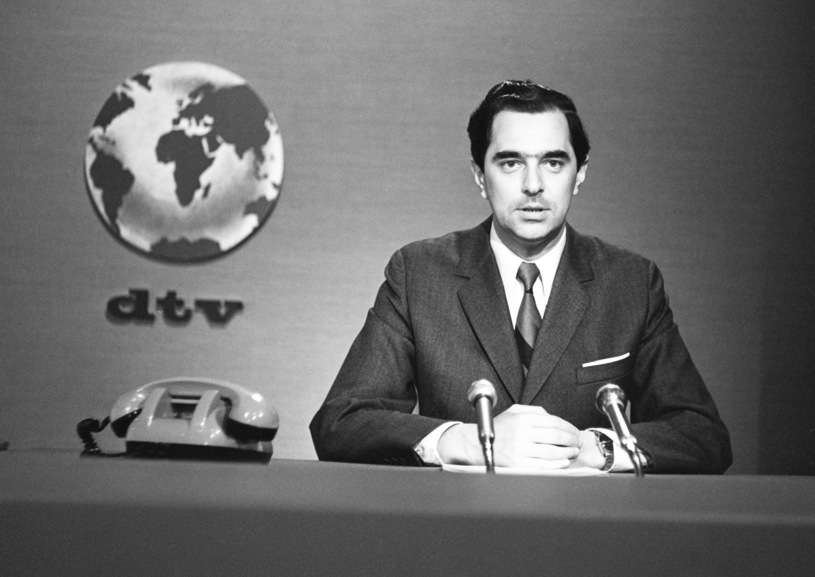
Examples of televised manipulation can be found in news programs that can reach mass audiences. Pictured is the Polish newscast program Dziennik, infamous for having attempted to slander capitalism in then-communist Poland using emotive and loaded language.

Media manipulation refers to orchestrated campaigns in which actors exploit the distinctive features of broadcasting mass communications or digital media platforms to mislead, misinform, or create a narrative that advances the interests and agendas of perpetrators of such campaigns.

In practice, media manipulation tactics may include the use of rhetorical strategies, including logical fallacies, deceptive content like disinformation, and propaganda techniques, and often involve the suppression of information or points of view by crowding them out, by inducing other people or groups of people to stop listening to certain arguments, or by simply diverting attention elsewhere. In Propaganda: The Formation of Men's Attitudes, Jacques Ellul writes that public opinion can only express itself through channels which are provided by the mass media of communication, without which there could be no propaganda.

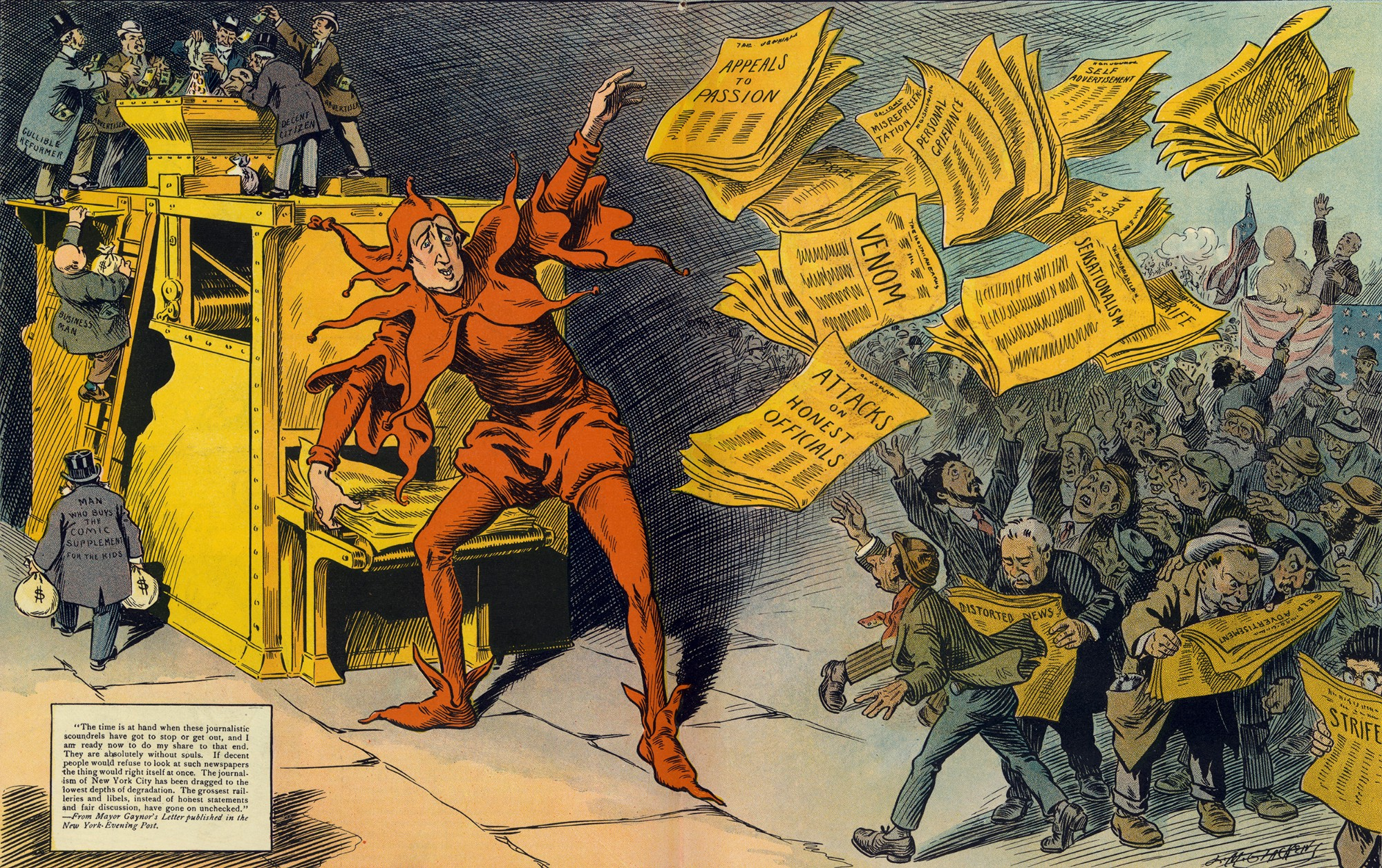
The Yellow Press, early 19th century

== Contexts ==
=== Advertising ===
"Daisy", a TV commercial for the re-election of U.S. President Lyndon B. Johnson. It aired only once, in September 1964, and is considered both one of the most controversial and one of the most effective political ads in American history.

Advertising is a form of promotion that seeks to persuade a specific audience to purchase a good or service. As one of the first types of marketing, it aims to influence its target market to either buy, sell, or carry out a particular action.

These advertisements are not only done by businesses but can also be done by other groups. Non-commercial advertisers are those who spend money on advertising in the hope of raising awareness for a cause or promoting specific ideas.

Advertising has evolved throughout time, and companies and political organizations have figured out how to use advertisements to manipulate viewers to see a certain message pushed out. Researcher Adam Klein dives into this utilizing terms like "Counterfeit Narratives" to describe recent advertising techniques. Essentially using an advertisement to not sell a product but to sell a fact or idea. There have also been occurrences of websites, commercials and even gaming apps that consistently sell or push the same ads over and over again. This is to compel people to associate their interests and personal usage of websites with whatever is being sold or shown. Apps and search engines are utilizing sites to continuously feed users the same sort of information through ads.

=== Hoaxing ===
A hoax is something intended to deceive or defraud. Misleading public stunts, scientific frauds, false bomb threats and business scams are examples of hoaxes.

=== Propagandizing ===
Propagandizing is a form of communication that is aimed at influencing the attitude of a community toward some cause or position by presenting only one side of an argument. Propaganda is commonly created by governments, but some forms of mass communication created by other influential organizations can be considered propaganda. As opposed to impartially providing information, propaganda, in its most basic sense, presents information primarily to influence an audience. Propaganda is usually repeated and dispersed over a wide variety of media in order to create the desired result in audience attitudes. While the term propaganda has justifiably acquired a strongly negative connotation by association with its most manipulative and jingoistic examples (e.g. Nazi propaganda used to justify the Holocaust), propaganda in its original sense was neutral, and could refer to uses that were generally benign or innocuous, such as public health recommendations, signs encouraging citizens to participate in a census or election, or messages encouraging persons to report crimes to the police, among others.

Propaganda uses societal norms and myths that people hear and believe. Because people respond to, understand and remember simpler ideas, this is what is used to influence people's beliefs, attitudes and values.

"People are turning to propaganda as a media epithet because it helps to express discomfort with media — and the "fake news" controversy is just one part of this discomfort", wrote Caroline Jack in the Data & Society article, What's Propaganda Got To Do With It?

=== Psychological warfare ===
Psychological warfare is a term used to denote actions taken by governments with the aim of evoking a planned psychological reaction in other people.

This tactic has been used in multiple wars throughout history. During World War II, the western Allies expected that the Soviet Union would drop leaflets on the US and England. During the conflict with Iraq, American and English forces dropped leaflets, with many of the leaflets telling the people how to surrender. In the Korean War both sides would use loudspeakers from the front lines. In 2009 people in Israel in the Gaza war received text messages on their cell phones threatening them with rocket attacks. The Palestinian people were getting phone calls and leaflets warning them that they were going to drop rockets on them. These phone calls and leaflets were not always accurate.

=== Public relations ===
Public relations is the management of the flow of information between an individual or an organization and the public.

== Techniques ==
Rage baiting, outrage porn, etc. involve media broadcast of content designed to manipulate increased viewer engagement, often by provoking negative emotional responses aligned with political or other narratives.

Means of influence include, but are not limited to, the methods outlined in Influence: Science and Practice, which include appealing to authority and making the person aware of the scarcity of an offer.

=== Deepfakes ===
Deepfakes are photos, videos, or audio that are changed or completely created using artificial intelligence to look and sound real. Because they can be very convincing, it's often hard to tell them apart from real content. The word "deepfake" comes from "deep learning", the type of AI used, and "fake", meaning the content is not real.

=== Astroturfing ===
Astroturfing is when there is an intent and attempt to create the illusion of support for a particular cause, person, or stance. While this is mainly connected to and seen on the internet, it has also happened in newspapers during times of political elections. Corporations and political parties try to imitate grassroots movements to sway the public into believing something that is not true.

In a study done by Tasente and Popescu in 2025, they introduce the idea of "Fake Majority". This expands on the way that corporations and political parties not only create the illusion of a large support for a cause but also silence those who disagree, because if they see they are part of the minority they are more likely to stay silent. As human beings it is natural that people want to belong, and by making something seem extremely supported and part of the majority, it encourages others to follow the lead, even if this is just a manipulation tactic. Overall this affects people's trust in statistics and information published towards certain stances and causes. Now people are more likely to be skeptical rather than follow their own opinion and judgement.

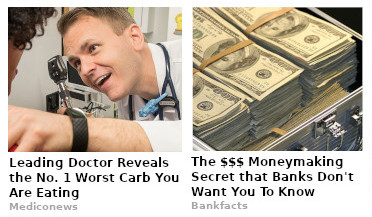
Examples of typical clickbait with headlines containing exaggerated or sensationalized information

=== Clickbait ===
Clickbait refers to headlines of online news articles that are sensationalized or sometimes wholly fake. It uses people's natural curiosity to get people to click. In some cases, clickbait is used to generate income; more clicks mean more money is made with advertisers. But these headlines and articles can also be used to influence a group of people on social media. In some cases, they are constructed to appeal to the interest group's pre-existing biases and thus to be shared within filter bubbles.

A 2023 Pew Research Center survey found that respondents enjoyed the convenience, speed and "element of social interaction,'' with news they receive from social media. But there was an increase, from 31% to 40%, in the percentage of respondents who expressed concerns about inaccuracies, low quality, and politically biased information on social media, according to an article about the survey titled, What Americans Like and Dislike About Getting News on Social Media.

=== Information laundering ===
Information laundering is a method of using a less trusted or less popular platform to publish a story of dubious origin or veracity for the purposes of reporting on that report rather than the story itself. This technique serves to insulate the secondary, more established media from having to issue a retraction if the report is false. Generally, secondary reports will report that the original report is reporting without verifying or making the report themselves.

=== Search engine marketing ===
In search engine marketing, websites use market research from past searches and other sources to increase their visibility in search engine results pages. This allows them to guide search results along the lines they desire, thereby influencing searchers.

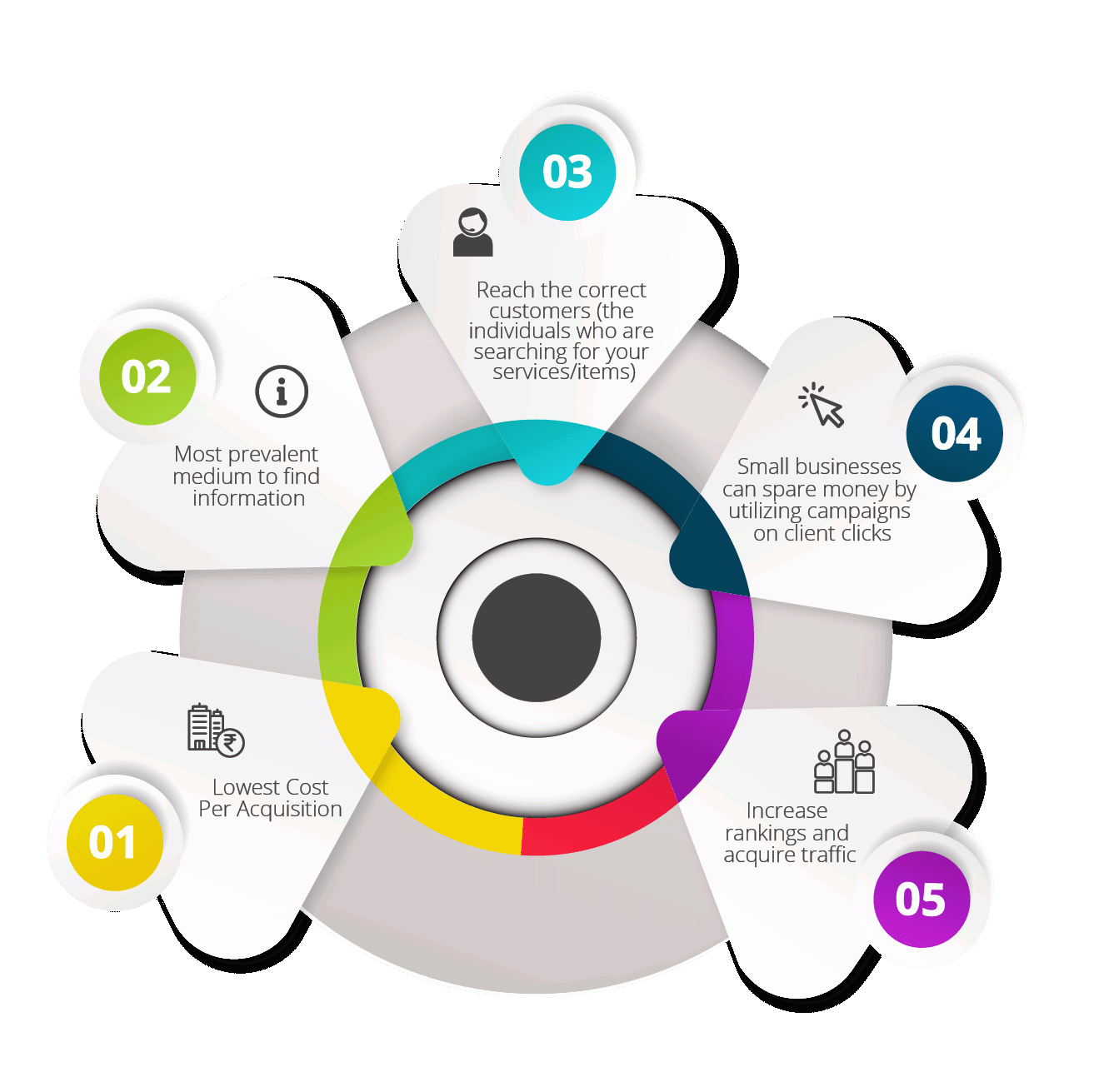
Search engine marketing

Businesses have many tactics to entice customers to their websites to generate revenue, such as banner ads, search engine optimization and pay-per-click marketing tools. They all serve different purposes and use different tools that appeal to multiple types of users. Banner ads appear on sites in an attempt to attract visitors to a linked website. Search engine optimization is a technique in which a website is optimized to receive a higher ranking from the search engine, causing it to be returned more often in searches.

=== Distraction ===
==== Distraction by major events ====
Commonly known as a "smoke screen", this technique consists of making the public focus its attention on a topic that is more convenient for the propagandist. This particular type of media manipulation has been referenced in popular culture. For example, the movie Wag the Dog (1997) illustrates how the public can be deceitfully distracted from an important topic by presenting another whose only quality is that of being more attractive.

Politicians might distract the public from domestic issues by diverting attention to global issues to reduce pressure domestically.

==== Distracting the public ====
This is a variation of the traditional arguments known in logic as ad hominem and ad populum, but applied to countries instead of individuals. This technique consists of refuting arguments by appealing to nationalism or by inspiring fear and hate toward a foreign country or all foreigners. It has the potential to be important since it gives the propagandists the power to discredit any information coming from other countries.

==== Straw man fallacy ====
An informal fallacy. The "straw man" consists of appearing to refute the opponent's argument while attacking another topic. For it to work correctly, the topic that was refuted and the one that should have been refuted need to be similar.

=== Voice replication ===
Voice replication is artificially generated audio created by artificial intelligence (AI) to create a realistic replication of someone's voice. AI uses machine learning models and can replicate the specific characteristics of a target voice, such as pitch, tone, and cadence. It is commonly used to deceive and cause disruption.

=== Video and photo manipulation ===
==== Photo manipulation ====
Visual media can be transformed through photo manipulation, commonly called "photoshopping." This can make a product, person, or idea seem more appealing. Specific product features are highlighted to attract and persuade the public, and specific editing tools are used to enhance the photo. Some techniques include cropping, resizing, airbrushing, color-enhancing, and removing or adding subjects from the original image. The motivation for photo manipulation may be for pure artistic creativity or more nefarious reasons to deceive. Photo manipulation is used extensively in the advertising and fashion industry and has been the subject of controversy for its part in false advertising and promoting unrealistic images of beauty.

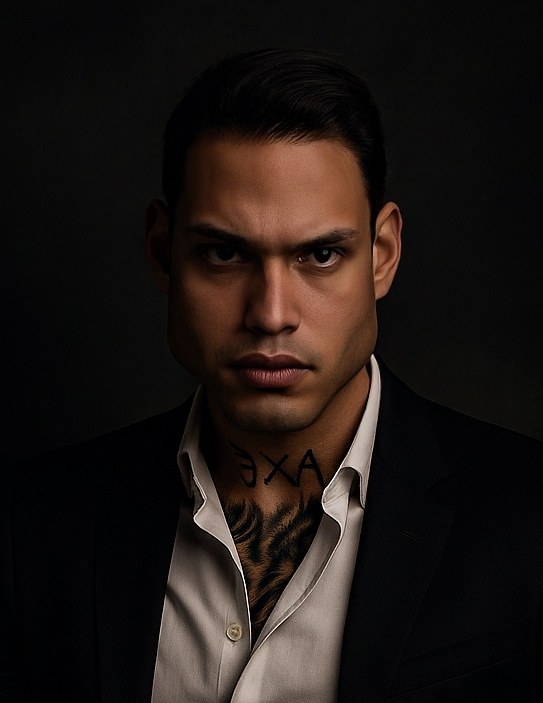
Photo Altered using Facetune

==== Video manipulation ====
Video manipulation is a variant of media manipulation that targets digital video using a combination of traditional video processing and video editing techniques and auxiliary methods from artificial intelligence like face recognition. In typical video manipulation, the facial structure, body movements, and voice of the subject are replicated in order to create a fabricated recording of the subject. The applications of these methods range from educational videos to videos aimed at mass manipulation and propaganda, a straightforward extension of the long-standing possibilities of photo manipulation. This form of computer-generated misinformation has contributed to fake news, and there have been instances when this technology was used during political campaigns in an attempt to influence the outcome.

== Manipulation in Social Media ==
Social media has changed how manipulation works. In the past, major news outlets would twist information, but in today's age anyone can use social media to spread misleading content which makes it harder to protect accurate information.

Because news spreads faster online, reporters feel pressure to publish quickly, sometimes before checking facts. Whoever posts something first online regarding any form of information can influence how people view an event, even if the information is wrong.

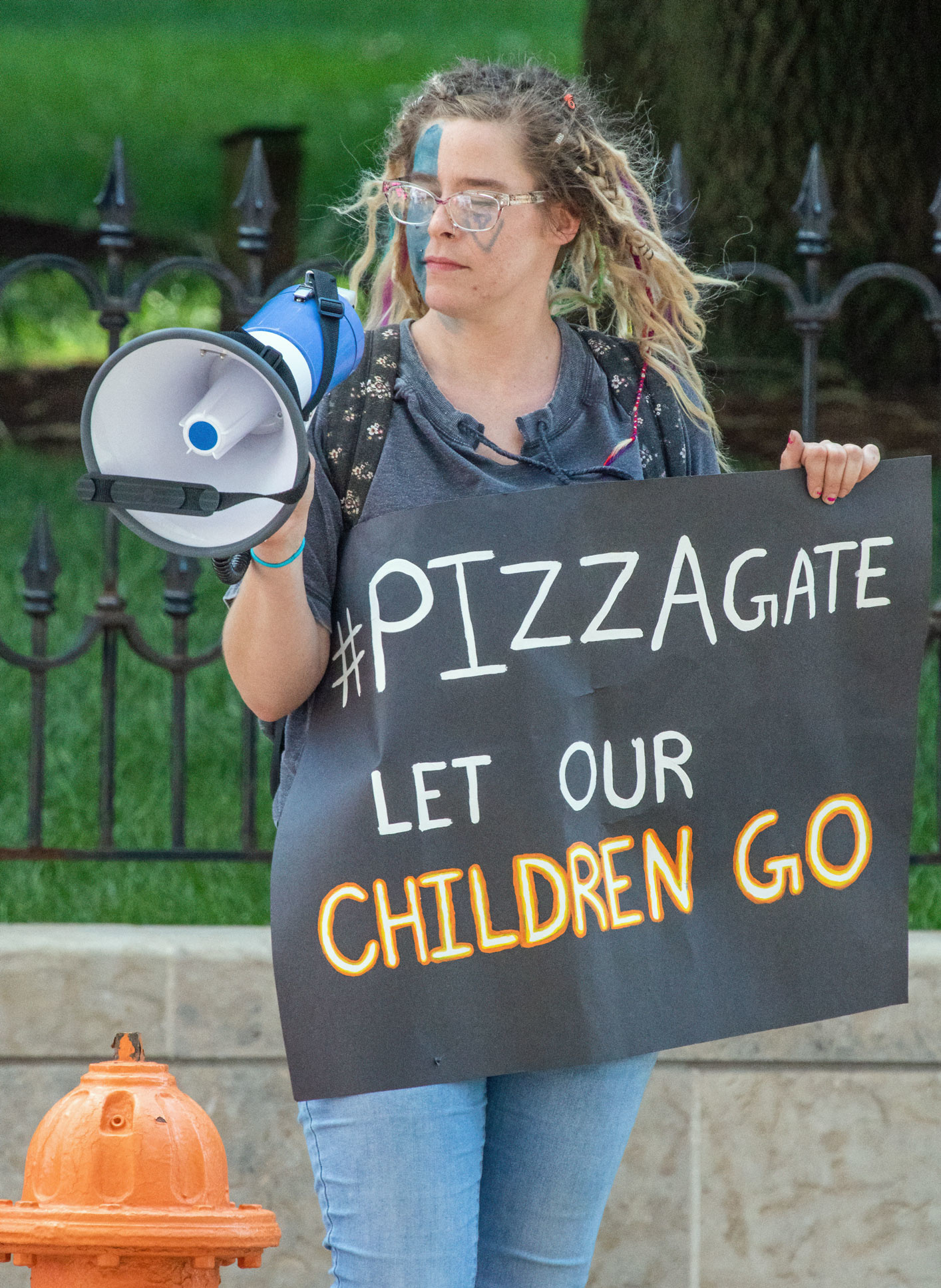
Protesting right-wing American

Cases like the 2016 "Pizzagate" conspiracy show how false claims online can lead to real-world harm.

Social media algorithms also make the problem worse by pushing exciting or emotional posts, which helps misinformation spread quickly and repeatedly within like-minded groups.

== See also ==
- Audio deepfake
- Black propaganda
- Concentration of media ownership
- Crowd manipulation
- Deepfake
- Disinformation
- Sensationalism
- Spin (public relations)
