= Gloria Seruwagi =

Ugandan public-health specialist

- Born: Uganda
- Occupation: Public health academic

Academic background
- Education: Makerere University; London School of Hygiene and Tropical Medicine; University of Huddersfield

Academic work
- Institutions: Makerere University
- Main interests: Socio-behavioral sciences; social equity

Gloria Seruwagi is an Ugandan public health academic. She is the Director at the Centre for Health and Social Economic Improvement (CHASE-i) and a faculty member at Makerere University. Her research and teaching interests include socio-behavioral sciences and social equity.

== Education ==
Seruwagi graduated from Makerere University, the London School of Hygiene and Tropical Medicine and completed her PhD at the University of Huddersfield.

== Career ==
Seruwagi conducted a comprehensive study on violence against children in refugee settings under the Baobab Research Program Consortium and the population Council. She works with key multisectoral, multi-level stakeholders in the social and health sector including government departments, the private sector, civil society, development partners and UN bodies. In addition to Uganda, Gloria's work has covered different countries including Kenya, Tanzania, Rwanda, Burundi, Democratic Republic of Congo (DRC), South Sudan, Ethiopia, Malawi, Bangladesh and the UK.

She has led a number of projects which include; Food and Beverage Advertising to Children in Uganda intended to assess the food environment, its effect on childhood obesity and Uganda's Non-Communicable Diseases, Refugee Lived Experiences, Compliance and Thinking in COVID-19, the study that assessed knowledge, attitudes and practices; exploring local perception of risk; documenting experiences; and determining the feasibility of and compliance with guidelines.
