= The Journal of Collective Negotiations =

Journal of Collective Negotiations
- Discipline: Industrial and labor relations
- Language: English
- Edited by: David Dilts

Publication details
- Former name(s): Journal of Collective Negotiations in the Public Sector
- History: 1972-2008
- Publisher: Baywood Publishing (United States)
- Frequency: Quarterly

Standard abbreviations
- ISO 4: J. Collect. Negot.

Indexing
- ISSN: 0047-2301 (print); 1541-4175 (web)
- LCCN: 2006222965
- OCLC no.: 72051000

Links
- Journal homepage; Online access; Online archive

The Journal of Collective Negotiations was a peer-reviewed academic journal which published articles regarding collective bargaining. The target audience for the journal was academics, students, employers, workers, and collective bargaining negotiators. It was published quarterly until 2008 by Baywood Publishing. The journal was cited by the Oxford Handbook of Work and Organization as a critical journal in collective bargaining theory and issues. A common textbook in Industrial and organizational psychology has cited the journal as one of two key publications in that very narrow field. It also has been quoted by the National Labor Relations Board.

== Aims and scope ==
The Journal of Collective Negotiations, now defunct, was established in 1972 as the Journal of Collective Negotiations in the Public Sector. The last issue was published in 2008. Its establishment was a direct outgrowth of the expansion of collective bargaining rights in the United States to public sector workers. By 1979, Contemporary Sociology was calling it one of the most prominent journals in the labor relations field.

The journal changed its name in 2004 to reflect a broadening of its editorial mission. It currently publishes articles, book reviews, and comments on collective bargaining in both the private and public sectors. It covers a wide range of topics, including collective bargaining economics, preparation for bargaining, techniques at the bargaining table, labor law, dispute resolution, arbitration, impasse resolution, new developments in collective bargaining language, organizational behavior, contract administration, faculty salaries, the history of collective bargaining and labor-management relationships, and laws and regulations pertaining to collective bargaining. Although the journal focuses on the United States, many articles are comparative or transnational in focus. For example, Human Resources and Skills Development Canada has cited articles on comparable worth which have been published in the journal.

== Abstracting and indexing ==
The journal is abstracted and indexed in Current Contents/Social and Behavioral Sciences, Current Contents/Health Services Administration, Current Law Index, Educational Administration Abstracts, Hospital Literature Index, Linguistics & Language Behavior Abstracts, Management Contents, Peace Research Abstracts, Recent Publications on Government Problems, Social Sciences Citation Index, Sociological Abstracts, Social Services Abstracts, Urban Affairs Abstracts, Wilson Business Abstracts, and Work Related Abstracts.
