= The switch (con) =

Type of swindle

The switch is a type of confidence trick designed to obtain money from a victim by exchanging a phoney package or bundle for the package containing the money. This trick requires two con artists.

The switch has six steps:

1. The con artists spot a target (the mark) and one of the con artists approach and engages the target in a brief conversation. The second con artist approaches the both of them and feigns to be injured, attracting the attention of both the target and the other con artist.
2. The second con artist claims that he needs to transport a large amount of money to a location across town immediately but cannot get there because of his injury, and begs one of the two men to go. The first con artist says that he isn't going in that direction, thus shifting responsibility over to the target.
3. The second con artist offers the target some of the money if he'll agree to take it to the location. Following his agreement to the deal, the first con artist will question his method of transportation – "what if you get mugged?"
4. The first con artist takes the money and offers to show him how to transport the money without losing it. The first con artist wraps the money in a large cloth and asks the target to give him any other money that he has that he also wouldn't want stolen. He takes all the money and wraps it in the cloth and tucks into his belt, under his shirt, to demonstrate how to carry it.
5. When he pulls out the money in the cloth to return it to the target, the first con artist takes another cloth parcel that looks identical to the one with the real money, weighing an equal weight, and gives it to the target.
6. The target absconds with the cloth parcel and leaves and the two con artists escape with the original money, and the target's money, in the real cloth parcel.

This con is occasionally seen in film and television. It was used in the opening sequence of the 1973 film The Sting and in the first season (2004) of the BBC One television series Hustle.

== See also ==
- Bait-and-switch
