= Robert Cialdini =

American author and psychologist (born 1945)

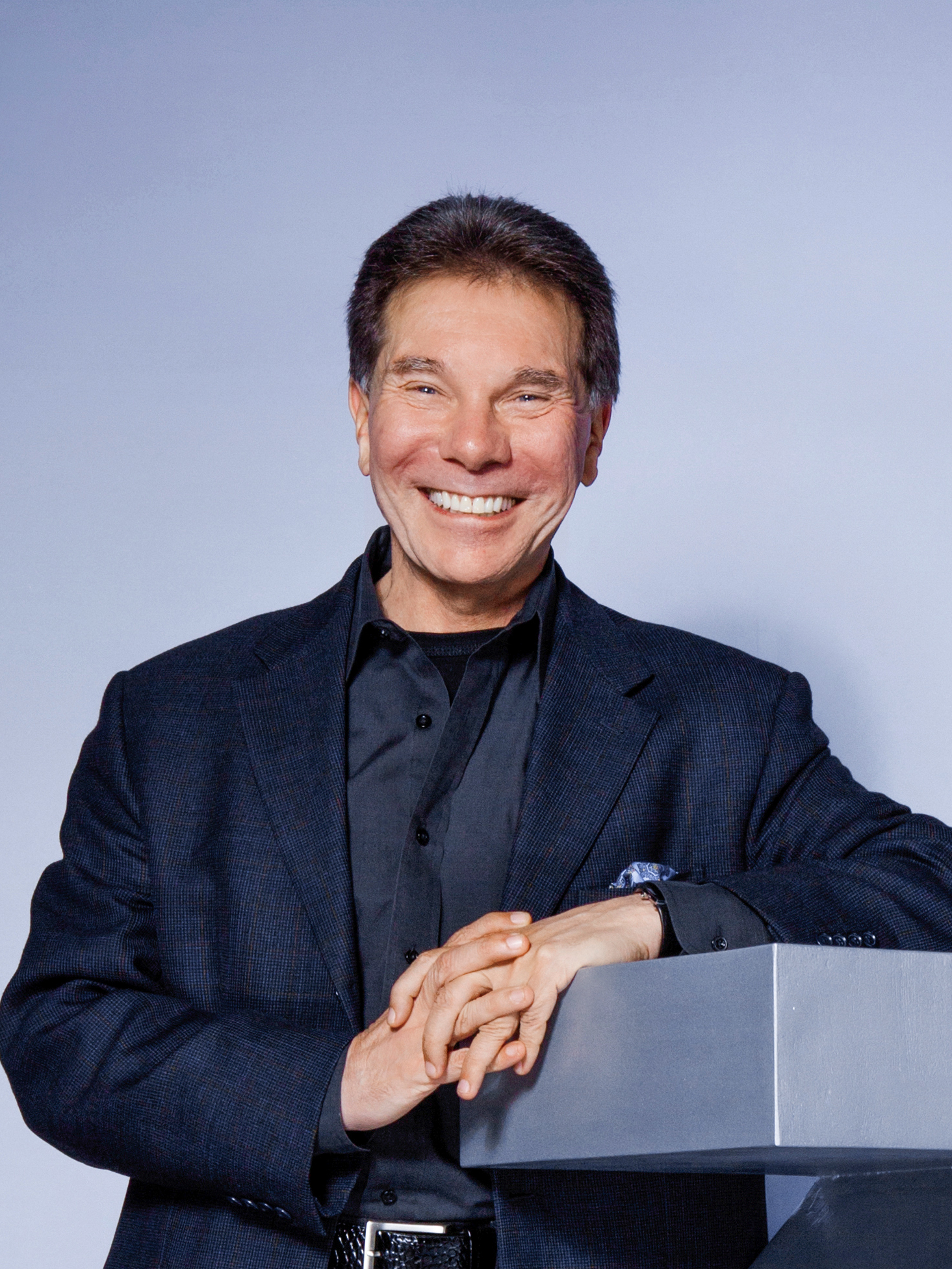
- Cialdini in 2012
- Born: April 27, 1945 (age 81)
- Education: University of Wisconsin–Milwaukee (BS); University of North Carolina (PhD)
- Occupations: Psychologist; author; speaker; Professor

Robert Beno Cialdini (/tʃælˈdiːni/; born April 27, 1945) is an American psychologist and author. He is Regents' Professor Emeritus of Psychology and Marketing at Arizona State University and has served as a visiting professor of marketing, business and psychology at Stanford University.

== Education ==
Cialdini earned his Bachelor of Science degree from the University of Wisconsin–Milwaukee in June 1967. He subsequently pursued graduate studies in social psychology at the University of North Carolina, where he earned his PhD in June 1970, followed by postgraduate training in social psychology at Columbia University.

He has held visiting scholar appointments at Ohio State University, the University of California, Santa Cruz the Annenberg School of Communications, and the Graduate School of Business of Stanford University. He is currently Regents' Professor Emeritus of Psychology and Marketing at Arizona State University.

== Work ==
Cialdini wrote the 1984 book on persuasion and marketing, Influence: The Psychology of Persuasion. It was based on three "undercover" years applying for and training at used car dealerships, fund-raising organizations, and telemarketing firms to observe real-life situations of persuasion. He found that influence is based on six key principles: reciprocity, commitment and consistency, social proof, authority, liking, scarcity. In 2016 he proposed a seventh principle. He called it the unity principle. The more we identify ourselves with others, the more we are influenced by these others.

The book has sold over five million copies and has been translated into 41 languages. It has been listed on the New York Times Best Seller list and Fortune lists it in their "75 Smartest Business Books". It is mentioned in 50 Psychology Classics.

Cialdini’s books, particularly Influence and Pre-Suasion, have sold more than seven-million copies in 44 different languages.

One of Cialdini's other books, Yes! 50 Scientifically Proven Ways to Be Persuasive, was a New York Times Bestseller; and another of his books, The Small BIG: Small changes that spark a big influence, was a Times Book of the year. In 2016, Cialdini published Pre-suasion, which became a New York Times and Wall Street Journal bestseller.

The Robert B. Cialdini prize from the Society for Personality and Social Psychology is named after him in honor of psychological research that demonstrates societal relevance using field methods. He was elected a member of the National Academy of Sciences in April 2019.

== Projects ==
Cialdini was hired alongside many other behavioral scientists for the Barack Obama presidential campaign, 2012. He also advised in the early stages of the Hillary Clinton presidential campaign, 2016.

== Dialog attendance ==
Cialdini appears in a leaked list of members of Peter Thiel’s secret society, Dialog.

== Selected publications ==
- Influence: The Psychology of Persuasion (William Morrow e Company, 1984), ISBN 0688128165
  - New and Expanded edition (Harper Business, 2021), ISBN 978-0062937650
- Influence: Science and Practice (Allyn & Bacon, 2000), ISBN 978-0321011473
  - 4th edition (Allyn and Bacon, 2001), ISBN 978-0321011473
  - 5th edition (Allyn and Bacon, 2008), ISBN 978-0205609994
- Yes! 50 Scientifically Proven Ways to be Persuasive with Noah J. Goldstein and Steve J. Martin (Simon and Schuster, 2008), ISBN 978-1416570967.
- The Small BIG: Small changes that spark a big influence with Steve J. Martin and Noah J. Goldstein (Grand Central Publishing, 2014), ISBN 978-1455584253
- Pre-Suasion: A Revolutionary Way to Influence and Persuade (Simon & Schuster, 2016), ISBN 978-1501109799

== See also ==
- Basking in reflected glory
