= Bait-and-switch =

Form of fraud

Bait-and-switch is a form of fraud used in retail sales but also employed in other contexts. First, the merchant "baits" the customer by advertising a product or service at a low price; then when the customer goes to purchase the item, they discover that it is unavailable, and the merchant pressures them instead to purchase a similar but more expensive product ("switching").

Bait-and-switch techniques have a long and widespread history as a part of commercial culture. Many variations on the bait-and-switch appear, for example, in the Ming Dynasty book of stories about fraud, Zhang Yingyu's The Book of Swindles (c. 1617).

== Function ==
The intention of the bait-and-switch is to encourage purchases of substituted goods, making consumers satisfied with the available stock offered, as an alternative to a disappointment or inconvenience of acquiring no goods (bait) at all, and reckoning on a seemingly partial recovery of sunk costs expended trying to obtain the bait. It suggests that the seller will not show the original product or service advertised but instead will demonstrate a more expensive product or a similarly priced, but lower-quality, product. In either case, the seller expects to earn a higher margin on the substitute product.

== Legality ==
In the United States, courts have held that the purveyor of a bait-and-switch operation may be subject to a lawsuit by customers for false advertising, and can be sued for trademark infringement by competing manufacturers, retailers, and others who profit from the sale of the product used as bait. However, no cause of action will exist so long as the purveyor is capable of actually selling the goods advertised, even if they aggressively push a competing product.

Likewise, advertising a sale while intending to stock a limited amount of, and thereby sell out, a loss-leading item advertised is legal in the United States. The purveyor can escape liability if they make clear in their advertisements that quantities of items for which a sale is offered are limited, or by offering a rain check on sold-out items.

In England and Wales, bait and switch is banned under the Consumer Protection from Unfair Trading Regulations 2008; breaking this law can result in a criminal prosecution, an unlimited fine and two years in jail.

In Canada, this tactic is illegal under the Competition Act. In Australia, bait advertising is illegal under the Competition and Consumer Act 2010 (formerly known as the Trade Practices Act 1974).

== Examples ==
=== In retail ===
Car dealerships and auto brokers have been known to use various forms of bait-and-switch or similar tactics, such as advertising vehicles online at what seems like a bargain price, only for the customer to discover that the specific vehicle is no longer available, as well as adding on a plethora of additional fees or even changing the sale price when coming close to closing the sale.

Online sellers use bait-and-switch by showing a photograph of a desired item to get sales, then shipping a cheaper copy of the item or a picture of the item.

=== Other ===
A bait-and-switch job offer is when the actual work has large discrepancies with what was described in the job listing or interview.

A bait-and-switch interview is when a potential employee hires another person to be their stand-in during the job interview process.

In lawmaking, "caption bills" that propose minor changes in law with simplistic titles (the bait) are introduced to the legislature with the ultimate objective of substantially changing the wording (the switch) at a later date in order to try to smooth the passage of a controversial or major amendment. Rule changes are also proposed (the bait) to meet legal requirements for public notice and mandated public hearings, then different rules are proposed at a final meeting (the switch), thus bypassing the objective of public notice and public discussion on the actual rules voted upon.

In humor, bait-and-switch is when the person sends expectations in one direction, and then takes it in another. For example, rickrolling.

== See also ==
- AIDA (marketing)
- Choice architecture
- Clickbait
- Contract of sale
- Cross-selling
- Door-in-the-face technique
- Foot-in-the-door technique
- Introductory rate
- Invitation to treat
- Low-ball
- Marketing
- Outline of marketing
- Permission marketing
- Promotion
- Pyramid scheme
- Sales
- Selling technique
- The switch (con)
- Trojan horse (business)
- Upselling
- Value-added selling
