= Low-ball =

Negotiation technique

The low-ball is a persuasion, negotiation, and selling technique.

== Overview ==
=== By buyers ===
When used by buyer, the low-ball is an offer for goods or services far lower than the price the buyer is willing to pay, made in the hope that the seller will at least counter-offer a price lower than the original asking price. Sellers looking to maximize profit but expecting would-be buyers to haggle may conversely make a "high-ball" offer and/or asking price. Eg:- A car buyer offers an unreasonably low price to a dealer, hoping to settle for a fair discount.

=== By sellers ===
When a seller makes a low-ball offer this means an item or service is offered at a lower price than what is needed actually for the desired profit margin to be realized. The seller makes the offer with the intent of quickly raising the price in order to increase profits and/or with the intent of selling would-be buyers additional, more profitable products and services. An explanation for the effect is provided by cognitive dissonance theory. If a person is already enjoying the prospect of an excellent deal and the future benefits of the item or idea, then backing out would create cognitive dissonance, which is prevented by playing down the negative effect of the "extra" costs.

The converse offer from a buyer, a "high-ball" offer, is an offer at a price the buyer hopes is not quickly accepted, made with the intention of being replaced with a reduced price to pressure a reluctant seller. Eg:- Airlines offer cheap base fares but charge high fees for baggage, seat selection, and meals.

=== By taxpayers ===
Low-balling is also a form of tax evasion where a filer misrepresents the amount of taxable income on a tax return. It is most common in situations where the tax authorities reasonably expect taxable income to exist but cannot, without the taxpayer's cooperation, independently determine the amount for want of any reliable paper trail and/or other documentation.

For example, most jurisdictions legally require taxpayers to report gratuities and pay taxes on the full amount. However, if a taxpayer receives all of his or her gratuities in cash, (s)he may low-ball on his or her tax return by declaring only a portion of the gratuities received. Unless the taxpayer has failed to disclose anything at all (or declared an unrealistically low figure), then without reliable documentation to prove any suspicions tax authorities and the governments they serve face a dilemma – they choose not to pursue their suspicions or they can employ highly subjective and/or arbitrary enforcement methods (such as so-called "lifestyle audits") to provide legal basis to their claims. Either approach carries the risk of damaging public confidence in the integrity and/or fairness of the tax system with a segment of the population.

Tax authorities employ various methods to deter such activities. For example, the Internal Revenue Service in the United States requires employers in industries where tipping is common to maintain meticulous records of all tips earned and to account for tips when calculating payroll deductions, and also levies heavy penalties against employers and employees alike in cases of noncompliance. Even absent such rigorous and targeted recordkeeping requirements, the increasing prevalence of tipping using electronic payment methods makes it far easier today for tax authorities to obtain credible evidence of low-balling compared to past years.

Taxpayers able to claim deductions may sometimes "high-ball" these figures to low-ball their taxable income. For example, a taxpayer who is allowed to deduct fuel expenses may high-ball this write-off by also claiming fuel purchased for personal use. Especially if the taxpayer has falsified a mileage log and/or purchases personal use fuel from the same vendors (s)he uses for legitimate business fuel purchases (and obtains the same sort of receipts for both) then proving a taxpayer has illegally claimed such personal expenses can often be extremely difficult. In response, tax authorities suspecting such activities sometimes forgo criminal charges in favor of civil proceedings since these have a much lower standard of proof.

To further deter low-balling, lawmakers in some jurisdictions have even enacted measures to apply reverse onus in civil tax proceedings, meaning that when the tax authorities choose to pursue civil proceedings it is up to the taxpayer to prove that (s)he did not earn the disputed income and/or incur the disputed expenses legitimately and not the other way around. Eg:- A freelancer underreports cash payments received from clients to reduce taxable income.

== Negotiation ==
In negotiation, an ambit claim is an initial demand made over and above what is expected in counter-offers and settlement.

== Studies ==
Cialdini, Cacioppo, Bassett, and Miller (1978) demonstrated the technique of low-balling in a university setting. They asked an initial group of first-year psychology students to volunteer to be part of a study on cognition. The researchers were clear about the meeting time being 7 a.m. Only 31 per cent (control group) of the first-year college students were willing to sacrifice and wake up early to support research in psychology. In a second group condition (lowballed group), the subjects were asked the same favour, but this time they were not told a time. Of them, 56 per cent agreed to take part. After agreeing to help in the study, they were told that they would have to meet at 7 a.m. and that they could back out if they so wished. None backed out of their commitment.

On the day of the actual meeting, 95% of the lowballed group who agreed to participate showed up for their 7 a.m. appointment and 79% of the control group who agreed to participate. Hence, when people have already showed commitment it's least likely for them to back off as they have already made up their mind.

== See also ==
- Argument to moderation
- Bait-and-switch
- Boiler room
- Compliance (psychology)
- Creeping normality
- Door-in-the-face technique
- Foot-in-the-door technique
- Nirvana fallacy
- Overton window
- Predatory pricing
- Selling technique
- Setting up to fail
- Slippery slope
- Negotiation § Tactics
