= Foot-in-the-door technique =

Compliance tactic

Foot-in-the-door (FITD) technique is a compliance tactic that aims at getting a person to agree to a large request by having them agree to a modest request first.

If a smaller request is granted, then the person who is agreeing feels like they are obligated to keep agreeing to larger requests. The saying originates from door to door salesmen who keep the door from shutting with their foot, giving the customer no choice but to listen to the sales pitch.

== Classic experiments ==
In an early study, a team of psychologists telephoned housewives in California and asked if the women would answer a few questions about the household products they used. Three days later, the psychologists called again. This time, they asked if they could send five or six men into the house to go through cupboards and storage places as part of a 2-hour enumeration of household products. The investigators found these women were more than twice as likely to agree to the 2-hour request than a group of housewives asked only the larger request.

More recently, people were asked to call for a taxi if they became alcohol-impaired. Half of the people had also been asked to sign a petition against drunk driving (which they all did) and half had not. Those who had signed the petition (complied with a small request) were significantly more likely to comply with the larger request of calling a taxi when impaired compared to those who had not been asked to sign the petition.

Numerous experiments have shown that foot-in-the-door tactics work well in persuading people to comply, especially if the request is a pro-social request. Research has shown that FITD techniques work over the computer via email, in addition to face-to-face requests.

== History ==
The foot-in-the-door technique was first coined by Johnathan Freedman and Scott Fraser of Stanford University in 1966, when they conducted a study to try and prove this theory of granting smaller requests can lead to agreeing to larger requests. Their findings supported what they had thought was to be true. There was controversy over whether the same process that is involved in the self-perception theory, was similar to that of FITD. Researchers thought that because both theories have to do with maintaining an attitude/agreement that one had in the first place that maybe the processes were similar. In 1999, Jerry M. Burger from Santa Clara University conducted a study to see what the process of this technique is and how it works, he found that there this is just a simple technique and does not relate to self-perception theory.

== Enhancing the technique ==
The foot-in-the-door technique is also used in many commercial settings and can be illustrated using the door-to-door salesperson who eventually builds up their requests to a final purchase request. In an experiment, subjects were initially asked to have signs in their windows to promote recycling along with varying amounts of incentives ($0, $1, $3) for doing so. This study found that the FITD technique was more effective than any of the incentive strategies in producing behavioural persistence. This is supported by the self-perception theory, which states that the FITD technique is effective only because internal thoughts are what drive people's behaviour. That is, external pressure (such as indebtedness) for compliance is not as effective in increasing compliance.

In another study, participants were given a request that included a "but you are free" statement which reminded the participants that they could refuse the request to participate. This condition along with the FITD technique increased the compliance of the participants. These are two extensions to the FITD technique that help increase compliance in participants. These techniques can be used in the political, commerce and public awareness environments. For example, a study showed that having a questionnaire about organ donation increased the willingness of participants to become organ donors. It was found that increasing the number of items in the questionnaire did not necessarily affect the compliance to becoming a donor, that is, having a questionnaire alone was enough to increase the compliance.

A study by Guéguen showed that the foot-in-the-door-technique is not only effective in person, but also online. In his study, he found that asking students for help saving a document as an RTF file via email increased their willingness to complete an online survey emailed to them by the initial requester. This information coupled with work by Swanson, Sherman, and Sherman, which found that students' compliance to an initial, neutral and small request not only increased their willingness to comply with a subsequent larger and anxiety-producing request, but also indicated that the anxiety-producing request was deemed less anxiety-producing than did the control group, has very large implication for possible online uses of the FITD technique. With the privacy and anonymity provided by the internet, the technique could be used online to gather information about anxiety producing incidents in a manner that would not produce as much anxiety as in-person questioning would. Further research in this domain is needed.

== Examples ==
When someone expresses support for an idea or concept, that person is more likely to then remain consistent with their prior expression of support by committing to it in a more concrete fashion. A common example undertaken in research studies uses this foot-in-the-door technique: two groups are asked to place a large, very unsightly sign in their front yard reading "Drive Carefully". The members of one group have previously been approached to put a small sign in their front window reading "Be a Safe Driver", and almost all agreed. In one study, in response to the "Drive Carefully" request 76 percent of those who were initially asked to display the small sign complied, in comparison with only 17 percent of those in the other group not exposed to the earlier, less demanding, request.

- "Can I go over to Suzy's house for an hour?" followed by "Can I stay the night?"
- "Can I borrow the car to go to the store?" followed by "Can I borrow the car for the weekend?"
- "May I turn in the paper a few hours late?" followed by "May I turn it in next week?"
- "First six months interest free", or "No interest for two years".

In all four cases, it is actually easier to remain consistent with the first request by denying the second than by accepting it. For example, in the first request, the requestee has already agreed to a precise one-hour time period and if immediately asked, likely will not agree to a different time period. However, if there is a delay of days or weeks between the requests, they are more likely to be received favorably.

=== Case study ===
In a well-known study demonstrating the foot-in-the-door technique, Freedman and Fraser (1966) contacted individuals on behalf of the American Cancer Society. Participants in the experimental group were first asked to answer a few simple questions about cancer—a small and non-intrusive request. A few days later, these same individuals were asked if they would allow volunteers to visit their homes to collect donations for the cause.

The results showed that individuals who had complied with the initial small request were significantly more likely to agree to the larger, follow-up request compared to those who had not been approached earlier. This study supports the idea that initial compliance creates a self-perception of helpfulness or support, increasing the likelihood of consistent behavior when presented with a larger commitment.

== Applications to everyday life ==
There are a number of studies concerning the foot-in-the door technique and charitable donations. For example, Schwarzwald, Bizman, and Raz (1983) investigated the effectiveness of the FITD technique for door-to-door fundraising. In their study, some of the participants were first asked to sign a petition before being asked to make a donation to the organization (foot-in-the-door condition). Others were not asked to sign a petition before making a donation (control condition). The request to sign a petition was made two weeks prior to the request to make a donation. They found that a greater percentage of people made a donation in the foot-in-the-door condition than in the control condition. Also, they found that making the small request to sign a petition resulted in more money being donated than not making this request.

The findings from scientific studies on the foot-in-the-door technique have been mixed. Although some studies have found that the FITD technique can increase donations, other studies found no statistically significant effect for the technique on donations.

Chan and colleagues (2011) conducted a study in order to assess the efficiency of foot-in-the-door (FITD) technique versus the door-in-the-face technique (DITF) among 2nd-grade students in an after school center in Hong Kong. Sixty 2nd-grade students were the participants of their study, who were asked to fill out arithmetic exercises. Experimenters asked students to fill out the arithmetic worksheets in either two conditions, the foot-in-the-door condition, or the door-in-the-face condition. The experimenters' goal was to have to students complete a 20-item worksheet. In the foot-in-the-door condition, 12 out of 20 students agreed to complete the 20-item worksheet. In the door-in-the-face condition, 18 out of 20 students agreed to complete the 20-item worksheet. After analysis of the data, the DITF technique appeared to be a more favorable motivator for completing the arithmetic task. These results suggest that while FITD and DITF techniques are successful means for task compliance, DITF may be better suitable for children in an academic setting. Door-in-the-face may be a more effective means of compliance for children not only in this particular setting but also potentially for children in general. While previous findings have shown that both FITD and DITF techniques may be successful in task compliance, these techniques might not be applicable in every compliance setting. This hypothesis can be seen as a limitation to FITD techniques.

A study conducted in 1989 by the Indiana University Southeast and California State University showed that people were more willing to become organ donors after completing a questionnaire about donating organs. It did not matter whether the survey had 5 or 20 questions, it is proven to be just as successful. This survey was conducted with young college students, and the scholars mentioned doing another study with older, less-educated individuals to further support these findings and to broaden the population.

== Psychology ==
With all the research supporting that the foot-in-the-door technique is a successful compliance technique, there is a big question as to why humans tend to follow this pattern. The most well-known theory explaining the reasoning behind this is the self-perception theory. When a person has originally agreed to something, they will ask a question to themselves about why they agreed to these questions and when they come to the decision that it was truly their desire and nothing else influenced the answer, they will feel the need to stay consistent with their decision and will agree to a larger request. The self-perception theory was developed by Daryl Bem, a social psychologist and retired professor from Cornell University, and claims two things: One is that people come to their beliefs and attitudes based on what they enjoy doing and if there is a positive or negative outcome on an experience. The second is that when people do not enjoy something, there is no reasonable explanation of why they would take an interest in it. This theory is the most well known for explaining self-knowledge.

== Alternatives ==
In the foot-in-the-door technique smaller requests are asked in order to gain compliance with larger requests, while door-in-the-face (DITF) works in the opposite direction: larger requests are asked, with the expectation that they will be rejected, in order to gain compliance for smaller requests.

An alternative postulated by Dolinski (2011) is the foot-in-the-face (FITF) technique: compliance is greater when a second request of similar difficulty is made immediately after the first is rejected, or after a time lapse of two or three days if the first request is accepted. Researchers found between 63% and 68% compliance rates when using the FITF technique, while traditional techniques showed lower rates of around 50%.

== See also ==
- Door-in-the-face technique
- Bait-and-switch
- Ben Franklin effect
- Camel's nose
- Creeping normality
- Drip pricing
- First they came ...
- If You Give a Mouse a Cookie
- Low-ball
- Obedience (human behavior)
- Salami tactics
- Selling technique
- Stone Soup
