= Social psychology =

Study of social effects on people's thoughts, feelings, and behaviors

Social psychology is the methodical study of how thoughts, feelings, and behaviors are influenced by the actual, imagined, or implied presence of others.

Although studying many of the same substantive topics as its counterpart in the field of sociology, psychological social psychology places more emphasis on the individual, rather than society; the influence of social structure and culture on individual outcomes, such as personality, behavior, and one's position in social hierarchies. It also depends more heavily on experimental and laboratory research.

Social psychologists typically explain human behavior as a result of the relationship between mental states and social situations, studying the social conditions under which thoughts, feelings, and behaviors occur, and how these variables influence social interactions.

== History ==
=== 19th century ===
In the 19th century, social psychology began to emerge from the larger field of psychology. At the time, many psychologists were concerned with developing concrete explanations for the different aspects of human nature. They attempted to discover concrete cause-and-effect relationships that explained social interactions. To do so, they applied the scientific method to human behavior. One of the first published studies in the field was Norman Triplett's 1898 experiment on the phenomenon of social facilitation. These psychological experiments later went on to form the foundation of much of 20th century social psychological findings.

=== 20th century ===
According to Wolfgang Stroebe, modern social psychology began in 1924 with the publication of a classic textbook by Floyd Allport, which defined the field as the experimental study of social behavior.

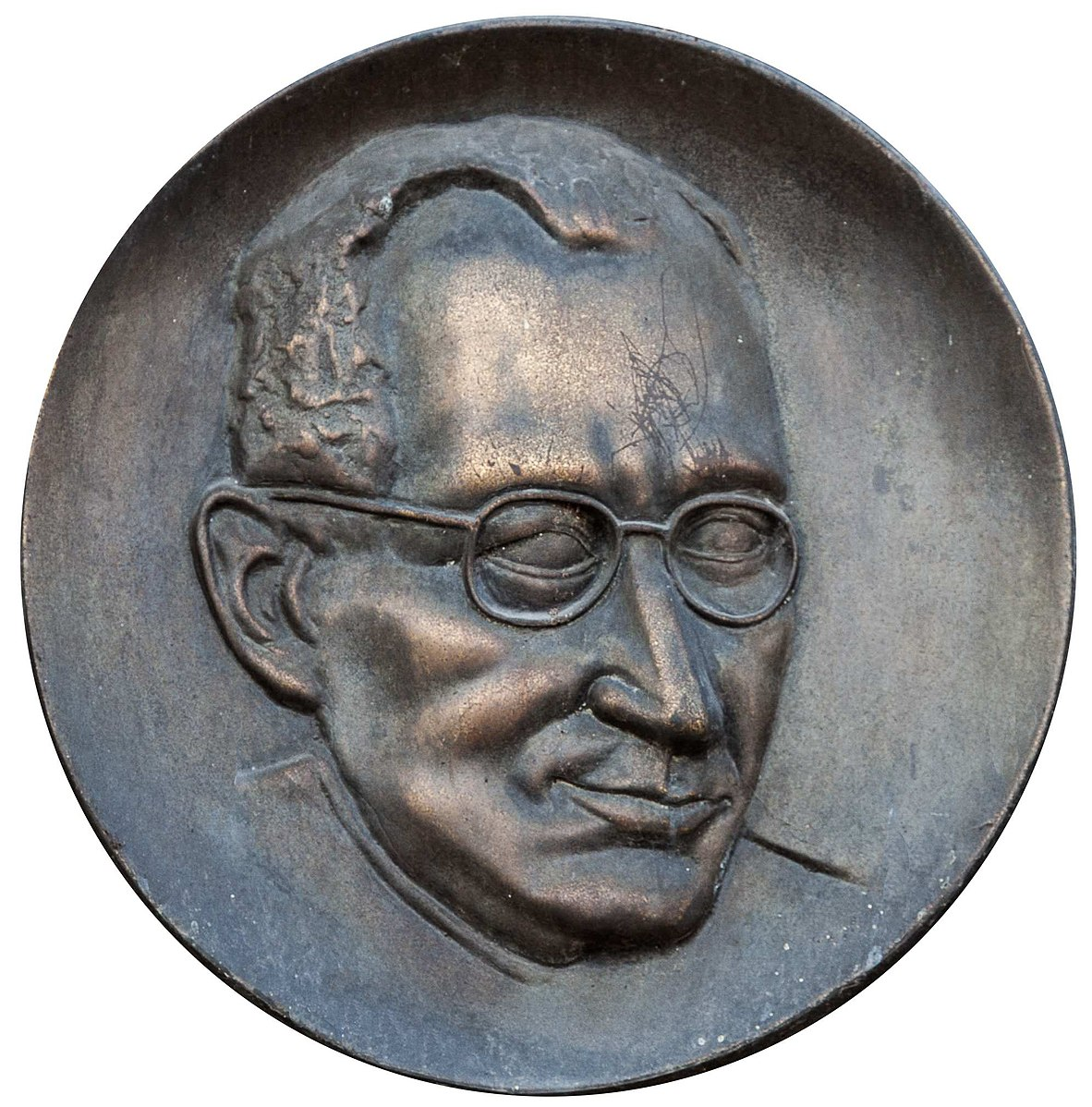
Sculpture of Kurt Lewin

An early, influential research program in social psychology was established by Kurt Lewin and his students. During World War II, social psychologists were mostly concerned with studies of persuasion and propaganda for the U.S. military (see also psychological warfare). Following the war, researchers became interested in a variety of social problems, including issues of gender and racial prejudice. Social stigma, which refers to the disapproval or discrimination against individuals based on perceived differences, became increasingly prevalent as societies sought to redefine norms and group boundaries after the war.

During the years immediately following World War II, there were frequent collaborations between psychologists and sociologists. The two disciplines, however, have become increasingly specialized and isolated from each other in recent years, with sociologists generally focusing on high-level, large-scale examinations of society and psychologists generally focusing on small-scale studies of individual human behavior.

During the 1960s, there was growing interest in topics such as cognitive dissonance, bystander intervention, and aggression. These developments were part of a trend of increasingly sophisticated laboratory experiments using college students as participants and analysis of variance designs.

In the 1970s, many conceptual challenges to social psychology emerged, including ethical concerns about laboratory experimentation, questions about whether attitudes could accurately predict behavior, and the extent to which science could be conducted within a cultural context. It was also in this period where situationism, the theory that human behavior changes based on situational factors, emerged and challenged the relevance of self and personality in psychology.

By the 1980s and 1990s, social psychology had developed some solutions to these issues concerning theory and methodology.

=== 21st century ===
At present, ethical standards regulate research, and pluralistic and multicultural perspectives to the social sciences have emerged. Most modern researchers in the 21st century are interested in phenomena such as attribution, social cognition, and self-concept. During the COVID-19 pandemic, social psychologists examined the effects of social isolation, fear, and misinformation on collective behavior. Research also focused on how pandemic-related stress affected mental health and social cohesion. Social psychologists are, in addition, concerned with applied psychology, contributing towards applications of social psychology in health, education, law, and the workplace.

== Core theories and concepts ==
=== Attitudes ===
In social psychology, an attitude is a learned, global evaluation that influences thought and action. Attitudes are basic expressions of approval and disapproval or likes and dislikes. For example, enjoying chocolate ice cream or endorsing the values of a particular political party are examples of attitudes. Because multiple factors influence people in any given situation, general attitudes are not always good predictors of specific behavior. For example, a person may generally value the environment but may not recycle a plastic bottle on a given day due to specific factors.

One of the most influential 20th-century attitude theories was Cognitive dissonance theory. According to this theory, attitudes must be logically consistent with each other. Noticing incongruence among one's attitudes leads to an uncomfortable state of tension, which may motivate a change in attitudes or behavior.

Research on attitudes has examined the distinction between traditional, self-reported attitudes and implicit, unconscious attitudes. Experiments using the Implicit Association Test (IAT), for instance, have found that people often demonstrate implicit bias against other races, even when their explicit responses profess impartiality. Likewise, one study found that in interracial interactions, explicit attitudes correlate with verbal behavior, while implicit attitudes correlate with nonverbal behavior.

Attitudes are also involved in several other areas of the discipline, such as conformity, interpersonal attraction, social perception, and prejudice.

=== Persuasion ===
Persuasion is an active method of influence that seeks to guide people toward adopting an attitude, idea, or behavior through rational or emotional means. Persuasion relies on appeals rather than strong pressure or coercion. The process of persuasion is influenced by numerous variables that generally fall into one of five major categories:

1. Communication: includes credibility, expertise, trustworthiness, and attractiveness.
2. Message: includes varying degrees of reason, emotion (e.g., fear), one-sided or two-sided arguments, and other types of informational content.
3. Audience: includes a variety of demographics, personality traits, and preferences.
4. Medium: includes printed word, radio, television, the internet, or face-to-face interactions.
5. Context: includes environment, group dynamics, and preliminary information.

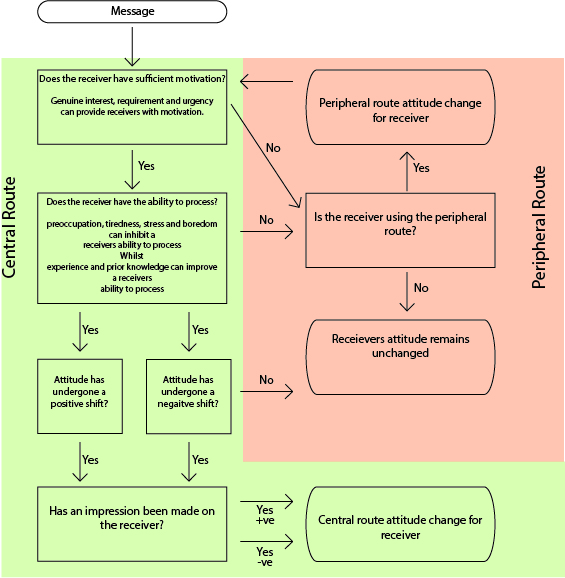
The Elaboration Likelihood Model is an influential model of persuasion.

Dual-process theories of persuasion (such as the elaboration likelihood model) maintain that persuasion is mediated by two separate routes: central and peripheral. Facts and results influence the central route of persuasion in longer-lasting change, but require motivation to process. The peripheral route is influenced by superficial factors (e.g., smiling, clothing) and results in shorter-lasting change, but does not require as much motivation to process.

=== Social cognition ===
Social cognition studies how people perceive, recognize, and remember information about others. Much research rests on the assertion that people think about other people differently than they do non-social, or non-human, targets. This assertion is supported by the social-cognitive deficits exhibited by people with Williams syndrome and autism.

==== Attribution ====
A major research topic in social cognition is attribution. Attributions are explanations of behavior, either one's own behavior or the behavior of others.

One element of attribution ascribes the cause of behavior to internal and external factors. An internal, or dispositional, attribution reasons that a behavior is caused by inner traits such as personality, disposition, character, and ability. An external, or situational, attribution reasons that a behavior is caused by situational elements such as the weather.A second element of attribution ascribes the cause of behavior to stable and unstable factors (i.e., whether the behavior will be repeated or changed under similar circumstances). Individuals also attribute causes of behavior to controllable and uncontrollable factors (i.e., the degree of control one has over the situation).

Numerous biases in the attribution process have been discovered. For instance, the fundamental attribution error is the bias towards making dispositional attributions for other people's behavior.The actor-observer bias is an extension of the theory, positing that a tendency exists to make dispositional attributions for other people's behavior and situational attributions for one's own. The self-serving bias is the tendency to attribute dispositional causes for successes, and situational causes for failure, particularly when self-esteem is threatened. This leads to assuming one's successes are due to innate traits and one's failures to circumstances.

==== Heuristics ====
Heuristics are cognitive shortcuts that are used to make decisions in place of conscious reasoning. The availability heuristic occurs when people estimate the probability of an outcome based on how easy that outcome is to imagine. As such, vivid or highly memorable possibilities will be perceived as more likely than those that are harder to picture or difficult to understand. The representativeness heuristic is a shortcut people use to categorize something based on how similar it is to a prototype they know of. Several other biases have been found by social cognition researchers. The hindsight bias is a false memory of having predicted events, or an exaggeration of actual predictions, after becoming aware of the outcome. Confirmation bias is a type of bias that leads to a tendency to search for or interpret information in a way that confirms one's preconceptions.

==== Schemas ====
Schemas are generalized mental representations that organize knowledge and guide information processing. They organize social information and experiences. Schemas often operate automatically and unconsciously. This leads to biases in perception and memory. Schemas may induce expectations that lead us to see something that is not there. One experiment found that people are more likely to misperceive a weapon in the hands of a black man than a white man. This type of schema is a stereotype, a generalized set of beliefs about a particular group of people (when incorrect, an ultimate attribution error). Stereotypes are often associated with negative or preferential attitudes and behaviors. Schemas for behaviors (e.g., going to a restaurant, doing laundry) are known as scripts.

=== Self-concept ===
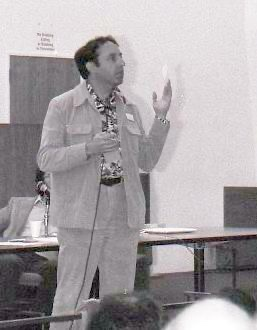
Daryl Bem

Self-concept is the whole sum of beliefs that people have about themselves. The self-concept is composed of cognitive aspects called self-schemas—beliefs people hold about themselves that guide the processing of self-referential information. For example, an athlete at a university would have multiple selves that would process different information pertinent to each self: the student would be oneself, who would process information pertinent to a student (taking notes in class, completing a homework assignment, etc.); the athlete would be the self who processes information about things related to being an athlete. These selves are part of one's identity, and the self-referential information is that which relies on the appropriate self to process and react to it.

There are many theories on the perception of our own behavior. Leon Festinger's 1954 social comparison theory posits that people evaluate their abilities and opinions by comparing themselves to others when they are uncertain about their own abilities and opinions. Daryl Bem's 1972 self-perception theory claims that when internal cues are difficult to interpret, people gain self-insight by observing their own behavior.

=== Social influence ===
Social influence is an overarching term that refers to the persuasive effects people have on one another. It is seen as a fundamental concept in social psychology. The study of it overlaps considerably with research on attitudes and persuasion. The three main areas of social influence include conformity, compliance, and obedience. Social influence is also closely related to the study of group dynamics, as most effects of influence are strongest within social groups.

The first major area of social influence is conformity. Conformity is defined as the tendency to act or think like other members of a group. The identity of members within a group (i.e., status), similarity, expertise, as well as cohesion, prior commitment, and accountability to the group, help determine an individual's level of conformity. Two types of social influences often drive conformity: informational social influence, which involves conforming to gain accurate information, and normative social influence, which involves conforming to be accepted or liked by the group. Individual variations among group members play a key role in the dynamic of how willing people will be to conform. Conformity is usually viewed as a negative tendency in American culture, but a certain amount of conformity is adaptive in some situations, as is nonconformity in other situations.

The second major area of social influence research is compliance, which refers to any change in behavior that is due to a request or suggestion from another person. Two common compliance strategies are 'foot-in-the-door,' which involves getting a person to agree to a small request to increase the likelihood of agreeing to a larger one, and 'door-in-the-face,' which involves making a large request that is likely to be refused to make a subsequent smaller request more likely to be accepted. The foot-in-the-door technique is a compliance method in which the persuader requests a small favor and then follows up with a larger one (e.g., asking for the time and then asking for $10). A related trick is the bait and switch, a disingenuous sales strategy that entices potential customers with advertisements for low-priced items that turn out to be unavailable, to sell a more expensive item.

The third major form of social influence is obedience, a change in behavior resulting from a direct order or command from another person. Obedience as a form of compliance was dramatically highlighted by the Milgram study, in which people were willing to administer electric shocks to a person in distress at a researcher's command.

An unusual kind of social influence is the self-fulfilling prophecy. This is a prediction that, by being made, causes itself to become true. For example, in the financial sector, if it is widely believed that a crash is imminent, investors may lose confidence, sell most of their stocks, and thus trigger a crash. Similarly, people may expect hostility in others and induce this hostility through their own behavior.

Psychologists have spent decades studying the power of social influence and how it manipulates people's opinions and behavior. Specifically, social influence refers to the way in which individuals change their ideas and actions to meet the demands of a social group, a received authority, a social role, or a minority within a group that wields influence over the majority.

=== Group dynamics ===
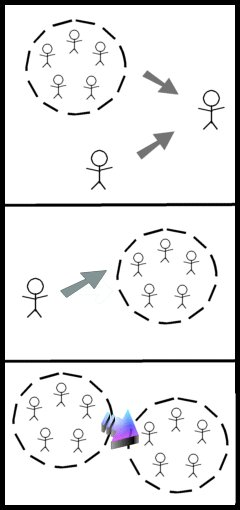
Social psychologists study interactions within groups, and between both groups and individuals.

Social psychologists study group-related phenomena such as the behavior of crowds. A group can be defined as two or more individuals who are connected by social relationships. Groups tend to interact, influence each other, and share a common identity. They have several emergent qualities that distinguish them from coincidental, temporary gatherings, which are termed social aggregates:

- Norms: Implicit rules and expectations for group members to follow.
- Roles: Implicit rules and expectations for specific members within the group.
- Relations: Patterns of liking within the group, and also differences in prestige or status.

The shared social identity of individuals within a group influences intergroup behavior, which refers to how groups behave toward and perceive one another. These perceptions and behaviors, in turn, define the social identity of individuals within the interacting groups.

The tendency to define oneself by group membership may lead to intergroup discrimination, which involves favorable perceptions and behaviors towards the in-group and negative perceptions and behaviors towards the out-group.

Groups often moderate and improve decision making, and are frequently relied upon for these benefits, such as in committees and juries. Groups also affect performance and productivity. Social facilitation, for example, is a tendency to work harder and faster in the presence of others.

Another important concept in this area is deindividuation, a reduced state of self-awareness that can result from feelings of anonymity. Deindividuation is associated with uninhibited and sometimes dangerous behavior. It is common in crowds and mobs, but a disguise, a uniform, alcohol, dark environments, or online anonymity can also cause it.

=== Interpersonal attraction ===
Factors influencing interpersonal attraction

A major area of study in people's relationships is interpersonal attraction, which encompasses all factors that lead people to like each other, form relationships, and, in some cases, fall in love. Social psychologists have discovered several general principles of attraction. One of the most important factors in interpersonal attraction is how similar two particular people are. The more similar two people are in their general attitudes, backgrounds, environments, worldviews, and other traits, the more likely they are to be attracted to each other.

Physical attractiveness is an important element of romantic relationships, particularly in the early stages, which are characterized by high levels of passion. Later on, similarity and other compatibility factors become more important, and the type of love people experience shifts from passionate to companionate. In 1986, Robert Sternberg suggested that there are actually three components of love: intimacy, passion, and commitment. When two (or more) people experience all three, they are said to be in a state of consummate love.

According to social exchange theory, relationships are based on rational choice and cost-benefit analysis. A person may leave a relationship if their partner's "costs" begin to outweigh the benefits, especially if good alternatives are available. This theory is similar to the minimax principle proposed by mathematicians and economists. With time, long-term relationships tend to become communal rather than based on exchange.

== Research ==
=== Methods ===
Social psychology is an empirical science that uses quantitative, qualitative, and increasingly computational methods to answer questions about human behavior. Careful attention to research design, sampling, and statistical analysis is important in social psychology.

Whenever possible, social psychologists rely on controlled experimentation, which requires the manipulation of one or more independent variables to examine the effect on a dependent variable. Experiments are useful in social psychology because they are high in internal validity, meaning that they are free from the influence of confounding or extraneous variables, and so are more likely to indicate a causal relationship accurately. However, the small samples used in controlled experiments are typically low in external validity, or the degree to which the results can be generalized to the larger population. There is usually a trade-off between experimental control (internal validity) and generalizability to the population (external validity).

Because it is usually impossible to test everyone, research is typically conducted on a sample of individuals from the wider population. Social psychologists frequently use survey research when they are interested in results with high external validity. Surveys use various forms of random sampling to obtain a sample of respondents that is representative of a population. This type of research is usually descriptive or correlational because there is no experimental control over variables. Some psychologists have raised concerns for social psychological research relying too heavily on studies conducted on university undergraduates in academic settings, or participants from crowdsourcing labor markets such as Amazon Mechanical Turk. In a 1986 study by David O. Sears, over 70% of experiments used North American undergraduates as subjects, a subset of the population that is unrepresentative of the population as a whole.

Regardless of the method chosen, social psychologists statistically assess the significance of their results before accepting them when evaluating an underlying hypothesis. Statistics and probability testing define what constitutes a significant finding, which can be as low as 5% or less and is unlikely to occur by chance. Replication testing is also important in ensuring that the results are valid and not due to chance. False positive conclusions, often resulting from the pressure to publish or the author's own confirmation bias, are a hazard in the field.

=== Famous experiments ===
==== Asch conformity experiments ====
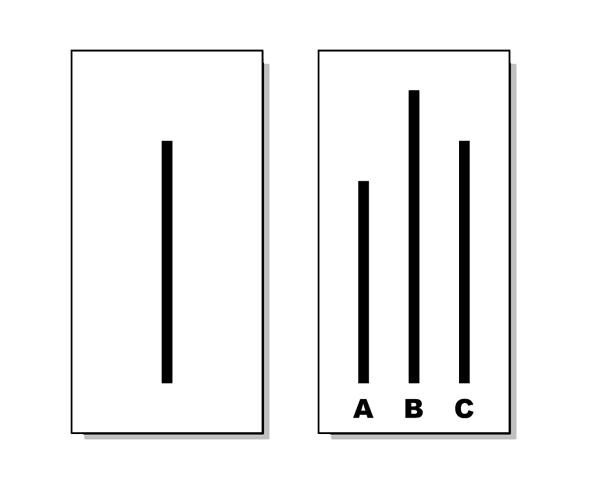
Which line matches the first line, A, B, or C? In the Asch conformity experiments, people frequently followed the majority judgment, even when the majority was objectively wrong.

The Asch conformity experiments used a line-length estimation task to demonstrate the power of people's impulses to conform to other group members. The task was designed to be easy to assess but wrong answers were deliberately given by at least some, oftentimes most, of the other participants. In well over a third of the trials, participants conformed to the majority, even though the majority judgment was clearly wrong. Seventy-five percent of the participants conformed at least once during the experiment. Additional manipulations of the experiment showed that participant conformity decreased when at least one other individual failed to conform, but increased when the individual began to conform or withdrew from the experiment. Also, participant conformity increased substantially as the number of "incorrect" individuals increased from one to three, and remained high as the incorrect majority grew. Participants with three other, incorrect participants made mistakes 31.8% of the time, while those with one or two incorrect participants made mistakes only 3.6% and 13.6% of the time, respectively.

==== Festinger cognitive dissonance experiments ====
In Leon Festinger's cognitive dissonance experiment, participants were divided into two groups and were asked to perform a boring task. Both groups were later asked to give their opinion of the task dishonestly, but were rewarded according to two different pay scales. At the end of the study, some participants were paid $1 to say they enjoyed the task, while the other group was paid $20 to tell the same lie. The first group ($1) later reported that they liked the task more than the second group ($20). Festinger explained that, for people in the first group, being paid only $1 was an insufficient incentive. This led them to experience dissonance, or discomfort and internal conflict. They could only overcome that dissonance by justifying their lies. They did this by changing their previously unfavorable attitudes about the task. Being paid $20 provided a reason for doing the boring task, which resulted in no dissonance.

The Milgram experiment: The experimenter (E) persuades the participant (T) to give what the participant believes are painful electric shocks to another participant (L), who is actually an actor. Many participants continued to give shocks despite pleas for mercy from the actor.

==== Milgram experiment ====
The Milgram experiment was designed to study how far people would go in obeying an authority figure. The experiment showed that normal American citizens would follow orders even when they believed they were causing an innocent person to suffer or even apparently die.

==== Stanford prison experiment ====
Philip Zimbardo's Stanford prison study, a simulated exercise in which students played correctional officers and inmates, sought to show how far people would go in role-playing. In just a few days, the guards became brutal and cruel, and the prisoners became miserable and compliant. This was initially argued to be an important demonstration of the power of the immediate social situation and its capacity to overwhelm normal personality traits. Subsequent research has contested the initial conclusions of the study. For example, it has been pointed out that participant self-selection may have affected the participants' behavior, and that the participants' personalities influenced their reactions in a variety of ways, including how long they chose to remain in the study. The 2002 BBC prison study, designed to replicate the conditions in the Stanford study, produced conclusions that were drastically different from the initial findings.

==== Bandura's Bobo doll ====
Albert Bandura's Bobo doll experiment attempted to demonstrate how aggression is learned by imitation. In the experiment, 72 children, grouped based on similar levels of pre-tested aggressivity, either witnessed an aggressive or a non-aggressive actor interact with a "bobo doll." The children were then placed alone in the room with the doll and observed to see whether they would imitate the actor's behavior. As hypothesized, the children who had witnessed the aggressive actor imitated the behavior and proceeded to act aggressively towards the doll. Both male and female children who witnessed the non-aggressive actor behaved less aggressively towards the doll. However, boys were more likely to exhibit aggression, especially after observing the behavior from an actor of the same gender. In addition, boys were found to imitate more physical aggression, while girls displayed more verbal aggression.

=== Ethics ===
The goal of social psychology is to understand cognition and behavior as they naturally occur in a social context. Still, the very act of observing people can influence and alter their behavior. For this reason, many social psychology experiments utilize deception to conceal or distort certain aspects of the study. Deception may include false cover stories, false participants (known as confederates or stooges), false feedback given to the participants, and other techniques that help remove potential obstacles to participation.

The practice of deception has been challenged by psychologists who maintain that deception under any circumstances is unethical and that other research strategies (e.g., role-playing) should be used instead. Research has shown that role-playing studies do not yield the same results as deception studies, casting doubt on the validity of role-playing studies. In addition to deception, experimenters have at times put people in potentially uncomfortable or embarrassing situations (e.g., the Milgram experiment and Stanford prison experiment), and this has also been criticized for ethical reasons.

Virtually all social psychology research today must pass an ethical review. At most colleges and universities, this is conducted by an ethics committee or institutional review board, which examines the proposed research to make sure that no harm is likely to come to the participants, and that the study's benefits outweigh any possible risks or discomforts to people participating.

Furthermore, a process of informed consent is often used to make sure that volunteers know what will be asked of them in the experiment and understand that they are allowed to quit the experiment at any time. A debriefing is typically conducted at the conclusion of the experiment to reveal any deceptions used and to ensure that the procedures do not harm participants. Today, most research in social psychology involves minimal risk, or no greater risk of harm than can be expected from normal daily activities or routine psychological testing.

=== Replication crisis ===
Many social psychological research findings have proven difficult to replicate, leading some to argue that social psychology is undergoing a replication crisis. A 2014 special edition of Social Psychology focused on replication studies, finding that many previously held social psychological beliefs were difficult to replicate. Likewise, a 2012 special edition of Perspectives on Psychological Science focused on issues ranging from publication bias to null-aversion, which have contributed to the replication crisis.

Some factors have been identified in social psychological research as contributing to the crisis. For one, questionable research practices have been identified as common. Such practices, while not necessarily intentionally fraudulent, often involve converting undesired statistical outcomes into desired outcomes via the manipulation of statistical analyses, sample sizes, or data management systems, typically to convert non-significant findings into significant ones. Some studies have suggested that at least mild versions of these practices are prevalent.

Some social psychologists have also published fraudulent research that has entered into mainstream academia, most notably the admitted data fabrication by Diederik Stapel as well as allegations against others. Fraudulent research is not the main contributor to the replication crisis. Many researchers attribute the failure to replicate as a result of the difficulty of being able to recreate the same conditions of a study conducted many years before, as the environment and people have changed.

Even before the current replication crisis, several effects in social psychology have also proven difficult to replicate. For example, the scientific journal Judgment and Decision Making has published several studies over the years that fail to provide support for the unconscious thought theory.

Replication failures are not unique to social psychology and are found in many fields of science. One of the consequences of the current crisis is that some areas of social psychology once considered solid, such as social priming, have come under increased scrutiny due to failure to replicate findings.

=== The "WEIRD" Problem ===
The "WEIRD problem" highlights the disproportionate representation of participants from Western, Educated, Industrialized, Rich, and Democratic (WEIRD) societies in psychological research. This issue has significant implications for how findings are generalized to all human populations. The heavy reliance on WEIRD samples may result in unrepresentative data, making it difficult to draw accurate conclusions about human behavior that apply to people from all cultural backgrounds.

Researchers have found that relying predominantly on WEIRD samples limits our ability to understand global human behavior accurately. Cross-cultural variations are often ignored, leading to the misconception that findings from WEIRD populations can be universally applied. This is problematic because WEIRD populations are not representative of the broader diversity of human experiences, which affects our understanding of basic psychological processes such as perception, cognition, and well-being.

Recognizing cultural diversity is essential not only for gaining multiple perspectives in problem-solving but also for ensuring that everyone feels included and represented in the study of psychology. Understanding different cultures enriches our knowledge of human nature and challenges existing biases, ultimately leading to a more comprehensive and inclusive body of psychological research. Thus, the WEIRD problem represents both a challenge and an opportunity: a need to broaden the scope of research to reflect better the true diversity of humanity.

== See also ==
- Crowd psychology
- Cultural psychology
- Intergroup relations
- List of cognitive biases
- List of social psychologists
- Political psychology
- Sociological approach to social psychology
