= Compliance (psychology) =

Submission to a request

Compliance is a response—specifically, a submission—made in reaction to a request. The request may be explicit (e.g., foot-in-the-door technique) or implicit (e.g., advertising). The target may or may not recognize that they are being urged to act in a particular way.

Compliance psychology is the study of the process where individuals comply to social influence, typically in response to requests and pressures brought on by others. It encompasses a variety of theories, mechanisms, and applications in a wide range of contexts (e.g. personal and professional). Compliance psychology is essential to understand across many different fields. Some of various fields include healthcare, where patients adherence to medical advice is necessary, furthermore, marketing where consumer behavior is prioritized strategies can be developed.

Social psychology is centered on the idea of social influence. It is the effect that words, actions, or mere presence of other people (real or imagined) have on our thoughts, feelings, attitudes, or behavior. Social influence is the driving force behind compliance. It is important that psychologists and ordinary people alike recognize that social influence extends beyond our behavior—to our thoughts, feelings, and beliefs—and that it takes on many forms. Persuasion and the compliance techniques are particularly significant types of social influence since they utilize the respective effect's power to attain the submission of others. Compliance is significant because it is a type of social influence that affects our everyday behavior—especially social interactions. Compliance is a complicated concept that must be studied in depth so that the uses, implications, theoretical, and experimental approaches may be better understood.

== Compliance Techniques ==
The following techniques have been proven to effectively induce compliance from another party.

=== Foot-in-the-door ===
In utilizing this technique, the subject is asked to perform a small request—a favor that typically requires minimal involvement. After this, a larger request is presented. According to "successive approximations", because the subject complied with initial requests, they are more likely to feel obligated to fulfill additional favors.

=== Door-in-the-face ===
This technique begins with an initial grand request. This request is expected to be turned down; thus, it is followed by a second, more reasonable request. This technique is decidedly more effective than foot-in-the-door since foot-in-the-door utilizes a gradual escalation of requests.

=== Low-ball ===
Frequently employed by car salesmen, low-balling gains compliance by offering the subject something at a lower price only to increase the price at the last moment. The buyer is more likely to comply with this price change since they feel like a mental agreement to a contract has occurred.

=== Ingratiation ===
This attempt to obtain compliance involves gaining someone's approval so they will be more likely to appease one's demands. Edward E. Jones discusses three forms of ingratiation:

1. flattery
2. opinion conformity and
3. self-presentation (presenting one's own attributes in a manner that appeals to the target)

=== Norm of reciprocity ===
This technique explains that due to the injunctive social norm that people will return a favor when one is granted to them; compliance is more likely to occur when the requestor has previously complied with one of the subject's requests.

== Compliance gaining ==
Compliance gaining is a term used in the social sciences that encompasses the intentional act of altering another's behavior. Research in this area originated in the field of social psychology, but communication scholars have also provided ample research in compliance gaining. While persuasion focuses on attitudes and beliefs, compliance gaining focuses on behavior.

== Estimation of compliance ==
Research also indicates that people tend to underestimate the likelihood that other individuals will comply with requests—called the underestimation of compliance effect. That is, people tend to assume that friends, but not strangers, will comply with requests to seek assistance. Yet, in practice, strangers comply with requests more frequently than expected. Consequently, individuals significantly underestimate the degree to which strangers will comply with requests.

== Personality Psychology and Compliance ==
In the study of personality psychology, certain personality disorders are characterized by traits that make individuals more prone to manipulating or coercing others into compliance:

- Antisocial Personality Disorder (ASPD): Individuals tend to display a glibness and grandiose sense of self-worth. Due to their shallow affect and lack of remorse or empathy, they are well suited to con or manipulate others into complying with their wishes.
- Histrionic Personality Disorder (HPD): Those with HPD often crave to be the center of attention. The need for validation can lead them to form relationships to gain attention and influence others. However, they discard relationships once they no longer serve purpose.
- Narcissistic Personality Disorder (NPD): People with NPD have inflated self-importance, hypersensitivity to criticism and a sense of entitlement that compels them to persuade others to comply with their requests.

== Social Psychology and Compliance ==
In social psychology, compliance is viewed as a form of social influence. A process in which individuals adjust their behaviors, attitudes, and beliefs to reach goals and attain social or personal gains. Unlike personality psychology that concentrates on an individual's personality or characteristics (that may drive their actions), social psychology takes a broader perspective and examines how social context, group dynamics, and situational factors shape an individual's willingness to comply. Their gaining of or submission to compliance is frequently influenced by construals—i.e. an individual's interpretation of their social environment and interactions.

- Construals and Interpretation: A person's construal, or interpretation of the social situation, affects whether they perceive the request in desirable outcome. In some cases they perceive it as a reasonable request in others it can be perceived as manipulative. These perceptions shape the willingness to comply.
- Situational Factors: External circumstances such as presence of authority figure or perceived consequences. So, factors like power and authority also play a key role in driving compliance.
- Group Dynamic: People are more likely to comply when they observe others doing so as well. When group pressure is present then others are more likely succumb to conforming.

== Evolving theories of compliance ==
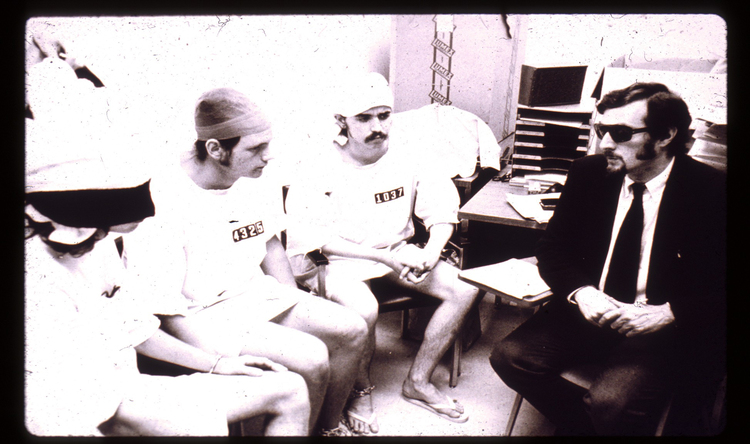
Stanford Prison Experiment

The study of compliance is often recognized for the overt demonstrations of dramatic experiments such as the Stanford prison experiment and the Stanley Milgram shock experiments. These experiments serve as a display of the psychological phenomena of compliance. In those instances, compliance frequently occurred in response to overt social forces. These types of studies have provided useful insight into the nature of compliance. However, today's researchers are inclined to concentrate their efforts on subtle, indirect, or unconscious social influences.

Those involved in this modern social-cognitive movement are attempting to discover the ways in which subjects' implicit and explicit beliefs, opinions and goals affect information processing and decision making in settings where influential forces are present. The social-cognitive movement puts emphasis on the importance of grasping cognitive processes to understand compliance. Researchers within the field study implicit and explicit beliefs and goals influence. In particularly, how they influence the individuals' decisions in social context. Furthermore, it redevelops tradition notions regarding social influence.

=== Philosophy vs Social Psychology ===
Philosophers view compliance in the context of arguments. Arguments are produced when an individual gives a reason for thinking that a claim is true. In doing so, they utilize premises (claims) to support their conclusion (opinion). Regardless of utilization of fallacy forms (e.g., apple-polishing, ad hominem) to get their point across, individuals engaged in philosophical arguments are overtly and logically expressing their opinion(s). This is an explicit action in which the person on the other side of the argument recognizes that the arguer seeks to gain compliance (acceptance of their conclusion).

In studying compliance, social psychologists aim to examine overt and subtle social influences experienced in various forms by all individuals. Implicit and explicit psychological processes are also studied since they shape interactions. These processes explain how certain individuals can make another comply and why someone else succumbs to compliance.

=== As a means of fulfilling needs ===
In complying with the requests of others or by following their actions, we seek to maintain the goals of social influence:

1. informative social influence
2. normative social influence

==== Informative social influence (goal of accuracy) ====
People are motivated to achieve their goals in the most efficient and accurate manner possible. When faced with information, an individual needs to correctly interpret and react—particularly when faced with compliance-gaining attempts since an inaccurate behavior could result in great loss. With that being said, people attempt to gain an accurate construal of their situation so they may respond accordingly.

Individuals are frequently rewarded for acting in accordance with the beliefs, suggestions and commands of authority figures, or social norms. Among other sources, authority may be gained on the basis of societal power, setting and size. Individuals are likely to comply with an authority figure's (or group's) orders or replicate the actions deemed correct by social norms because of an assumption that the individual is unaware of some important information. The need to be accurate—and the belief that others know something they do not—often supersedes the individual's personal opinion.

==== Normative social influence (goal of affiliation) ====
Humans are fundamentally motivated by the need to belong—the need for social approval through the maintenance of meaningful social relationships. This need motivates people to engage in behavior that will induce the approval of their peers. People are more likely to take actions to cultivate relationships with individuals they like and wish to gain approval from. By complying with others' requests and abiding by norms of social exchange (i.e., the norm of reciprocity), individuals adhere to normative social influence and attain the goal of affiliation. An example of both normative and informational social influence is the Solomon Asch line experiments.

=== Social Impact Theory ===
Bibb Latané originally proposed the social impact theory that consists of three principles and provides wide-ranging rules that govern these individual processes. The general theory suggests we think of social impact as the result of social forces operating in a social structure (Latané). The theory's driving principles can make directional predictions regarding the effects of strength, immediacy, and number on compliance. However, the principles are not capable of specifying precision on future outcomes.

==== Strength ====
The stronger and more important a group is to an individual—the more likely that individual is to comply with social influence. Strength refers to hierarchy, status, position of authority, and age in relation to social influence.

==== Immediacy ====
Immediacy refers to the closeness of the group to the individual at the time of an influence attempt. Immediacy includes proximity, distance, and buffers in regard to social influence. The proximity of the group makes an individual more likely to conform and comply with the group's pressures. These pressures are strongest when the group is closer to the individual and composed of people the individual cares about (e.g., friends, family) or authority figures.

==== Number ====
Number refers to the amount of individuals in the group. Number pertains to the sources and the targets involving social influence. Research has found that compliance increases as the number of people in the group increases. However, once the group gets larger, containing 4 or 5 people, compliance is less likely to occur. After this point, each additional person has less of an influence. However, adding more members to a small group of about 3 people has a greater effect on influence (Aronson).

==== Similarity ====
Although this variable is not included in Latané's theory, Burger et al. (2004) conducted studies that examined the effect of similarity and compliance to a request. Note that the shared characteristic (e.g., birthday, first name) had to be perceived as incidental. The findings demonstrated that people were more likely to comply with the requester when they believed the feature they shared was unplanned and rare.

=== Displayed by the SIFT-3M model ===
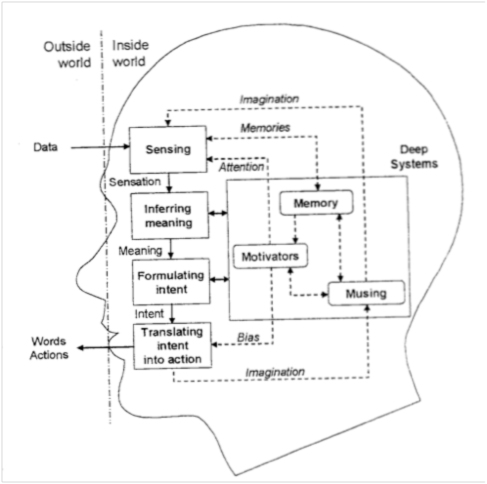
This depiction of the SIFT-3M Model highlights the psychological steps involved in gaining or succumbing to compliance.

A theoretical approach uncommon in major psychology literature is David Straker's, SIFT-3M model. It was created to discuss mental functioning in relation to psychological decisions (e.g., compliance). Straker proposes that by gaining a greater understanding of how people make sense of the world, how they think and how they decide to act, people can develop the basic tools needed to change others' minds by gaining compliance. In inducing compliance, requestors must understand the 9 stages or levels:

1. sensing
2. inferring meaning
3. formatting intent
4. translating intent into action
5. memory
6. motivators
7. musing
8. state
9. inner and outer worlds.

In using this model to understand and change the minds of others, Straker reminds requestors that they must talk to the other individual's internal map (thoughts and beliefs) and familiarize themselves with their inner systems.

== Major empirical findings ==
=== Solomon Asch line experiments ===
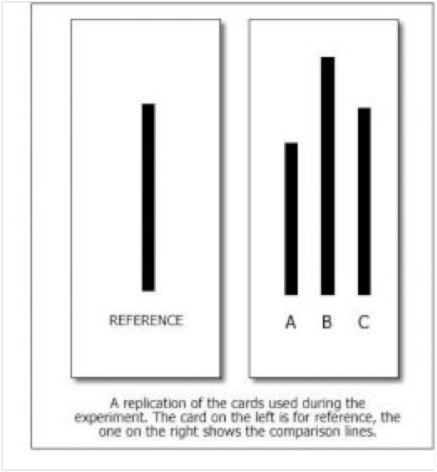
An example of the line test given to experiment participants

In Solomon Asch's experiment, 50 participants were placed in separate ambiguous situations to determine the extent to which they would conform. Aside from a single participant, the 7 other experiment members were confederates—individuals who understood the aim of the study and had been instructed to produce pre-selected responses. In the designated room, a picture of three lines of differing lengths was displayed. Each confederate was asked questions (e.g., which line is the longest, which line matches the reference line). In response, confederates gave largely incorrect answers.

==== Results ====
As a result, one-third of the participants gave the incorrect answer when the confederates produced unanimously incorrect answer(s). In accordance to the Goals of Social Influence, participants claimed that even when they knew the unanimous answer was wrong, they felt the group knew something they did not (informational social influence). Asch noted that 74% of subjects conformed to the majority at least once. The rate of conformity was reduced when one or more confederates provided the correct answer and when participants were allowed to write down their responses rather than verbally stating them.

==== Significance ====
The results of these studies support the notion that people comply to fulfill the need to be accurate and the need to belong. Additionally, it supports the social impact theory in that the experiment's ability to produce compliance was strengthened by its status (confederates seen as informational authorities), proximity and group size (7:1).

=== Stanley Milgram's experiment ===
Stanley Milgram's experiment set out to provide an explanation for the horrors being committed against Jews trapped in German concentration camps. The compliance to authority demonstrated by people working in concentration camps ignited the question: "Are Germans actually 'evil' or is it possible to make anyone to comply to the orders of an authority figure?" To test this, Stanley Milgram designed an experiment to see if participants would harm (shock) another individual due to the need to comply with authority. Milgram developed a pseudo-shock generator with labels beginning at 15 volts ("Slight Shock") to 450 volts ("XXX"). Participants took on the role of "teacher" and were informed they would be participating in a learning and memory test. In doing so, they had to teach the "student" (a confederate in a separate room) a list of words. The "teacher" was instructed to increase the voltage by 15 and shock the "student" each time he answered incorrectly. When a subject began to grow uneasy about shocking the confederate (due to voltage level, noises, ethics, etc.) the experimenter would encourage the participant to continue by proclaiming he would assume full responsibility for any harm done to the "student" and by saying phrases such as "It is absolutely essential that you continue." To rule out sadistic tendencies, all 40 "teachers" were male and were screened for competence and intelligence before beginning the experiment.

==== Results ====
100% of male participants delivered up to 300 volts ("Intense") to their assigned "student". 62% of participants administered 375 volts ("Strong Shock") and 63% participants shocked their "student" at the maximum level (450 volts).

When these alterations to the original experiment were made, the rate of compliance was not reduced:

- The victim claimed to have a heart condition
- Subjects were told the experiment was being conducted for marketing purposes
- Before the experiment began, the "student" extracted an explicit agreement from the "teacher" to stop on demand

The rate of compliance was reduced when:

- Two experimenters (conducting the experiment) disagreed about the "teacher" continuing
- Fellow "teachers" refused to continue (in experiments with multiple "teachers")
- Experimenter remained in a different room from the "teacher"
- The "teacher" was instructed to hold the "student's" hand on a shock plate

==== Significance ====
The ordinary people who shocked the victim did so out of a sense of obligation—an impression of his duties as a subject—and not from any peculiarly aggressive tendencies

— Stanley Milgram,

The results of Stanley Milgram's experiments indicate the power of informational and normative aspects of social influence. Participants believed the experimenter was in control and held information he personally did not. "Teachers" also showed a need for affiliation since they appeared to fear deviating from the experimenter's commands. Additionally, authoritative figures appear to have a large impact on the actions of individuals. As previously stated, individuals seeking affiliation and approval are more likely to comply with authority figures' demands.

=== Stanford prison experiment ===
This experiment was conducted to test social influence and compliance to authority through the utilization of a prison life situation. After answering a local newspaper ad (calling for volunteers for a study centered on the effects of prison life), 70 applications were checked for psychological problems, medical disabilities and crime/drug abuse history and reduced to 24 American and Canadian college students from the Stanford area. The all-male participant pool was divided into two groups (guards and prisoners) by flipping a coin. The prison was constructed by boarding up both sides of a corridor in the basement of Stanford's psychology department building. "The Yard" was the only place were prisoners were allowed to walk, eat or exercise—actions that were done blindfolded so they could not identify an exit. Prison cells were located in laboratory rooms where the doors had been removed and replaced with steel bars and cell numbers.

The incarcerated individuals believed they were being kept in the "Stanford County Jail" because before the experiment began, they did not know they would be labeled prisoners. On a random day, prisoners were subjected to an authentic police arrest. Cars arrived at the station and suspects were brought inside where they were booked, read their Miranda rights a second time, fingerprinted and taken to a holding cells where they were left blindfolded. Each prisoner received chains around their ankles and a stocking (to simulate a shaved head). Additionally, inmates lost their names and were subsequently referred to by their ID number.

==== Results ====
As the experiment progressed, participants assigned to guard positions escalated their aggression. Although guards were instructed not to hit the prisoners, they found ways to humiliate/disrupt them via systematic searches, strip searches, spraying for lice, sexual harassment, denying them of basic rights (e.g., bathroom use) and waking inmates from their sleep for head counts. Social and moral values initially held by the guards were quickly abandoned as they became immersed in their role.

Due to the reality of psychological abuse, prisoners were released 6 days later, after exhibiting pathological behavior and nervous breakdowns.

==== Significance ====
The Stanford Prison Project is a strong example of the power perceived authority can have over others. In this case, the authority was largely perceived; however, the consequences were real. Due to the assumed power held by the guards, even the "good" guards felt helpless to intervene. Additionally, none of the guards came late for a shift, called in sick, demanded extra pay for overtime or requested to be discharged from the study before its conclusion. The guards complied with the alleged demands of the prison while the prisoners complied with the perceived authority of the guards. Aside from certain instances of rebellion, the prisoners were largely compliant with the guards orders—from strip searches to numerous nightly "bed-checks".

The Experiment—a 2010 film—tells a version of the Stanford Prison Project. It focuses on 26 men who are chosen/paid to participate in an experiment. After being assigned the roles of guards and prisoners, the psychological study spirals out of control.

=== Compliance effect ===
Extensive research shows that people find it difficult to say "no" to a request, even when this request originates from a perfect stranger. For example, in one study, people were asked by a stranger to vandalize a purported library book. Despite obvious discomfort and reluctance of many individuals to write the world "pickle" in one of the pages, more than 64% complied with this vandalism request—more than double the requesters' prediction of a 28% rate of compliance.

In such interactions, people are more likely to comply when asked face-to-face than when asked indirectly or by e-mail.

==== Significance ====
This research shows that we tend to underestimate the influence we have over others, and that our appeal to others is more effective when it is made face to face. It also shows that even a suggestion we make in jest may embolden someone to commit immoral acts.

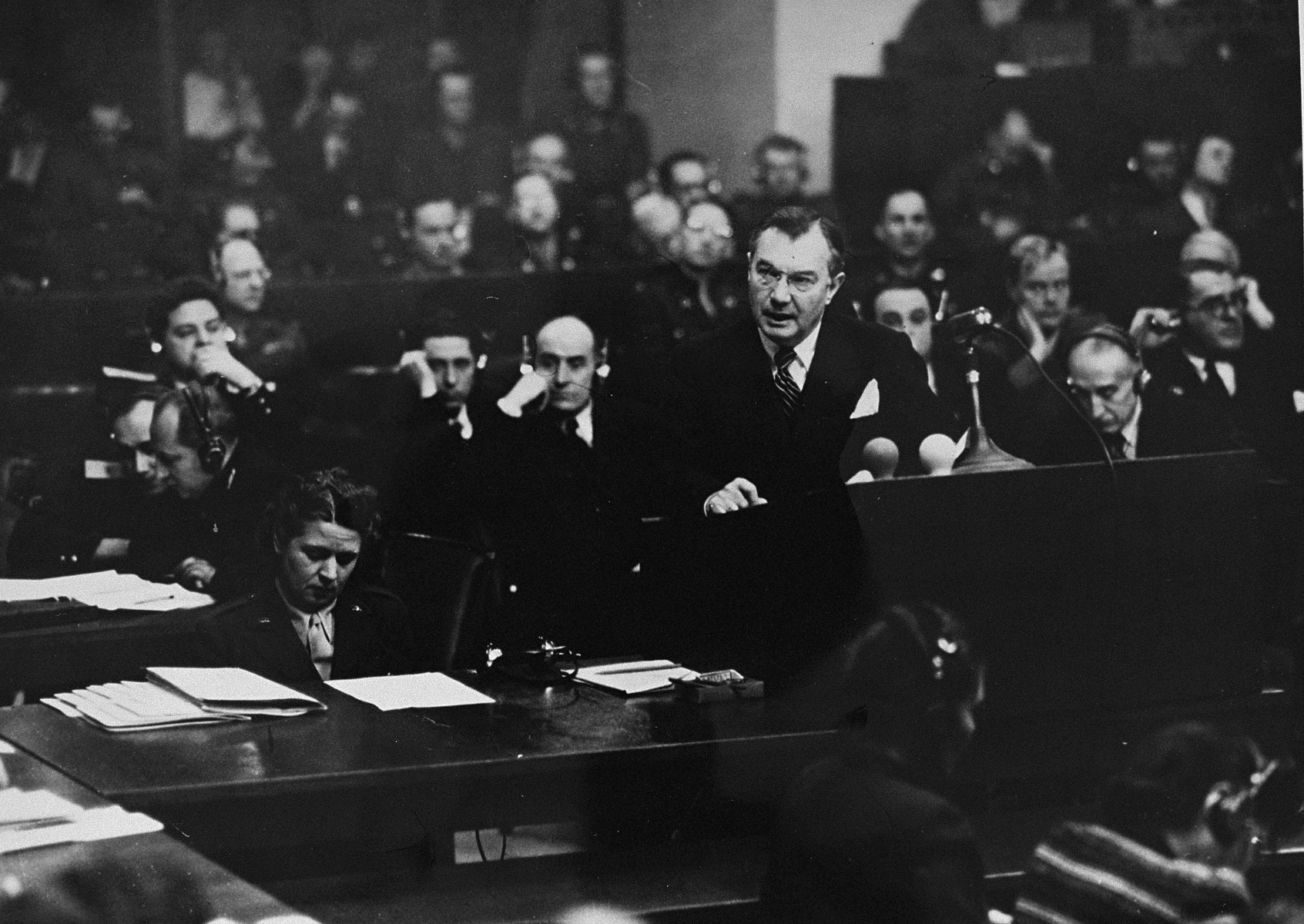
Prosecutor Robert H. Jackson at the Nuremberg Trials

=== Nuremberg Trials ===
The Nuremberg Trials were a series of tribunals held by the Charter of the International Military Tribunal (IMT) which was made up of members of the Allied Powers – Great Britain, France, the Soviet Union, and the United States – who presided the hearings of twenty-two major Nazi criminals. In these trials many of the defendants had stated that they had simply been following directions and failure to do so would have resulted in their punishment. By complying to the directions given by those above them in rank they knowingly caused harm and death to those involved in the Holocaust.

==== Results ====
At the end of the trials, 199 defendants were tried at Nuremberg. Of the 199 defendants: 161 were convicted with 37 being sentenced to death and 12 of the defendants were tried to by the IMT (International Military Tribunal). Although many involved in the trials were tried, some of the higher-ranking officials had fled Germany to live abroad with some even coming to the United States. An example of this was Adolf Eichmann who had fled and made refuge for himself in Argentina, He was later caught by Israel's Intelligence Service in which he was later tried, found guilty, and executed in 1962.

==== Significance ====
The information divulged during the event of the Nuremberg Trials suggest strong evidence in the power enforced over others from that of a higher authority. Many officials in the Nazi party pleaded to just have been following orders.

== Applications ==
=== Person-to-person interactions ===
The use of persuasion to achieve compliance has numerous applications in interpersonal interactions. One party can utilize persuasion techniques to elicit a preferred response from other individuals. Compliance strategies exploit psychological processes in order to prompt a desired outcome; however, they do not necessarily lead to private acceptance by the targeted individual. Meaning, an individual may comply with a request without truly believing the action(s) they are being asked to complete is acceptable. Because of this, persuasion techniques are often used one-sidedly in immediate situations where one individual wishes to provoke a specific response from another individual. For example, car salesmen frequently use the lowball technique to manipulate customers' psychological functioning by convincing them to comply with a request. By initially estimating a car's price to be lower than actuality, car salesmen recognize that the customer is more likely to accept a higher price at a later time. Compliance strategies (e.g., lowball, foot-in-the-door, etc.) are relevant to numerous person-to-person interactions when persuasion is involved. One individual can use such techniques to gain compliance from the other, swayed person. Other practical examples include:

- A child asking for an allowance raise with the foot-in-the-door technique
- A student using ingratiation (e.g., flattery) to ask for a raised grade
- An individual doing someone a favor, hoping that the norm of reciprocity will influence that someone to lend a hand at a later date
- A lawyer using ingratiation and their perceived authority to persuade a jury

=== Marketing ===
This graph depicts the effectiveness of compliance techniques in relation to solicitation.

Research has indicated that compliance techniques have become a major asset to numerous forms of advertising, including Internet shopping sites. Techniques are used to communicate essential information intended to persuade customers. Advertisements and other forms of marketing typically play on the customers' need for informative and normative social influence. The people in the advertisements and the ads themselves serve as a type of authority. They are credible—especially in regards to the product. As a result, customers' need to be accurate drives them to comply with the ad's message and to purchase a product that an authority claims they need. Secondly, people have the need to belong. Customers often comply with ads by purchasing certain merchandise in the hopes of affiliating with a particular group. Because compliance techniques play at psychological needs they are frequently successful in selling a product; the use of fear is often less persuasive.

=== Workplace safety ===
Organizations need to create a safe and healthy work environment for their members. Nevertheless, despite organizations being primarily responsible to enforce workplace safety protocol, employees bear the responsibility for their own safety and safety of those around them. The failure to follow the guidelines can hinder the wellbeing of employees and the organizations. However, organizations must have a thorough understanding of contextual variables to support or hinder compliance of safety guidelines. Researchers showed that awareness of severe consequences positively affect motivation, whereas of mild consequences decreases perceived severity. In addition, in a survey conducted in 16 countries demonstrated that contextual variables (e.g. feeling caged) leads to a lower compliance behaviours (e.g. social distancing).

== Controversies ==
While there is some debate over the idea and power of compliance as a whole, the main controversy—stemming from the subject of compliance—is that people are capable of abusing persuasion techniques in order to gain advantages over other individuals. Based on the psychological processes of social influence, compliance strategies may enable someone to be more easily persuaded towards a particular belief or action (even if they do not privately accept it). As such, the employment of compliance techniques may be utilized to manipulate an individual without their conscious recognition. A specific issue regarding this controversy has arisen during courtroom proceedings. Studies have shown that lawyers frequently implement these techniques in order to favorably influence a jury. For example, a prosecutor might use ingratiation to flatter a jury or cast an impression of his authority. In such cases, compliance strategies may be unfairly affecting the outcome of trials, which ought to be based on hard facts and justice, not simply persuasiveness.

== See also ==
- Authority bias
- Codependency
- Coercive power
- Forced compliance theory
- Gaslighting
- Nagging
- Nudge theory
- Shill
- Social exchange theory
- Social impact theory
