= Common good =

What is shared and beneficial for all or most members of a given community

In philosophy, economics, and political science, the common good, also named common wealth, commonweal, general welfare, or public benefit, is either what is shared and beneficial for all or most members of a given community, or alternatively, what is achieved by citizenship, collective action, and active participation in the realm of politics and public service. The concept of the common good differs significantly among philosophical doctrines. Early conceptions of the common good were set out by Ancient Greek philosophers, including Aristotle and Plato. One understanding of the common good rooted in Aristotle's philosophy remains in common usage today, referring to what one contemporary scholar calls the "good proper to, and attainable only by, the community, yet individually shared by its members."

The concept of common good developed through the work of political and moral philosophers, and public economists, including Thomas Aquinas, Niccolò Machiavelli, John Locke, Jean-Jacques Rousseau, James Madison, Adam Smith, Karl Marx, John Stuart Mill, John Maynard Keynes, John Rawls, and many other thinkers. In contemporary economic theory, a common good is any good which is rivalrous yet non-excludable, while the common good, by contrast, arises in the subfield of welfare economics and refers to the outcome of a social welfare function. Such a social welfare function, in turn, would be rooted in a moral theory of the good (such as utilitarianism). Social choice theory aims to understand processes by which the common good may or may not be realized in societies through the study of collective decision rules. Public choice theory applies microeconomic methodology to the study of political science in order to explain how private interests affect political activities and outcomes.

== Definition ==
The term common good has been used in many disparate ways and escapes a single definition. Most philosophical conceptions of the common good fall into one of two families: substantive and procedural. According to substantive conceptions, the common good is that which is shared by and beneficial to all or most members of a given community: particular substantive conceptions will specify precisely what factors or values are beneficial and shared. According to procedural formulations, by contrast, the common good consists of the outcome that is achieved through collective participation in the formation of a shared will. It is when one another respects others' dignity and rights.

== In the history of moral and political thought ==
=== Historical overview ===
Under one name or another, the common good has been a recurring theme throughout the history of political philosophy. As one contemporary scholar observes, Aristotle used the idea of "the common interest" (to koinei sympheron, in Greek) as the basis for his distinction between "right" constitutions, which are in the common interest, and "wrong" constitutions, which are in the interest of rulers; Saint Thomas Aquinas held "the common good" (bonum commune, in Latin) to be the goal of law and government; John Locke declared that "the peace, safety, and public good of the people" are the goals of political society, and further argued that "the well being of the people shall be the supreme law"; David Hume contended that "social conventions" are adopted and given moral support in virtue of the fact that they serve the "public" or "common" interest; James Madison wrote of the "public", "common", or "general" good as closely tied with justice and declared that justice is the end of government and civil society; and Jean-Jacques Rousseau understood "the common good" (le bien commun, in French) to be the object of a society's general will and the highest end pursued by government.

Though these thinkers differed significantly in their views of what the common good consists in, as well as over what the state should do to promote it, they nonetheless agreed that the common good is the end of government, that it is a good of all the citizens, and that no government should become the "perverted servant of special interests", whether these special interests be understood as Aristotle's "interest of the rulers", Locke's "private good", Hume's and Madison's "interested factions", or Rousseau's "particular wills".

=== Ancient Greeks ===
For the Ancient Greeks, the Common Good was the flourishing of the hierarchical network of people, known as the polis (one's city, or state). The phrase "common good" then, does not appear in texts of Plato, but instead the phrase "the good of a city". In The Republic, Plato's character Socrates contends repeatedly that a particular common goal exists in politics and society, and that that goal is the same as the goal for a flourishing human being, namely, to be a philosopher king, ruled by the highest good, Reason, rather than one of Plato's four lesser goods: honor-seeking, money-making, pleasure-seeking, or empassioned addiction. For Plato, the best political order is one in which the entire society submits to the dictates of the leaders' faculty of Reason, even communistically holding possessions, wives, and children in common, creating a "cohesion and unity" that "result[s] from the common feelings of pleasure and pain which you get when all members of a society are glad or sorry for the same successes and failures."

Plato's student Aristotle, considered by many to be the father of the idea of a common good, uses the concept of "the common interest" (to koinei sympheron in Greek) as the basis for his distinction between his three "right" constitutions, which are in the common interest, and "wrong" constitutions, which are in the interest of rulers. To Aristotle, Plato is wrong about the desire to simply impose top-down unity; for Aristotle, a common good is synthesized upwardly/teleologically from the lesser goods of individuals, and their various kinds of larger-and-larger partnerships: marital couple, or parent-over-child, or master-over-slave; household; then village; then state. In this teleological view, the good stems from objective facts about human life and purpose, which may vary, depending upon peoples' occupations, virtue-levels, etc. However, noting that only citizens have the salvation (common good) of the city at heart, Aristotle argues that, regardless of form of government, those who have more of a rational understanding of the needs of the state's salvation, are entitled to a greater share in administering and determining justice, within the light of its common good, than those who have less, or no such understanding or concern for it, such as selfish despots and political factions, as well as uneducated artisans and freedmen, women and children, slaves, etc. More than this, Aristotle argues that rational discourse itself is what the state's Common Good relies upon, identifying those who lack it as "slaves by nature", while those who excel in it are nearly divine, possessing in themselves the whole purpose for which states exist, namely, the perfectly complete good/blessed life. In his Nicomachean Ethics then, Aristotle ties up the Common Good of the state, with that of friendship, implying by this, that friendly, rational discourse is the primary activity by which citizens and rulers bring about the Common Good, both amongst themselves, and so far as it involves their inferiors. According to one common contemporary usage, rooted in Aristotle's philosophy, common good then refers to "a good proper to, and attainable, only by the community, yet individually shared in, by its members."

=== Machiavelli ===
During the 15th and 16th centuries, the common good was one of several important themes of political thought in Renaissance Florence. The thought goes back to Thomas Aquinas theory of common good being widespread in whole premodern Europe. In a later work, Niccolò Machiavelli speaks of the bene commune ('common good') or comune utilità ('common utility'), which refers to the general well-being of a community as a whole. In the dedicatory letter in the Discourses on Livy, Machiavelli states that he has a desire to act for the "common benefit of everyone". Machiavelli's common good is viewed by some scholars as not as "common", as he frequently states that the end of republics is to crush and weaken their neighbors. Rulers of principalities can also arrive at a common good without specifically aiming for it, for their power rests on actions which many people benefit. Machiavelli however does not mention the term at all in Il Principe. Leo Strauss claims that the highest form of common good is not the political ideal, but the truth "about man and society". The "Cambridge School" of interpretation holds Machiavelli to be a civic humanist and classical republican who viewed that the highest quality of republican virtue is self-sacrifice for the common good. Though some scholars assert that Machiavelli has a radically modern view of republics, accepting and unleashing the self interest of those who rule.

=== Jean-Jacques Rousseau ===
In Jean-Jacques Rousseau's The Social Contract, composed in the mid-18th century, Rousseau argues that society can function only to the extent that individuals have interests in common, and that the end goal of any state is the realization of the common good. He further posits that the common good can be identified and implemented only by heeding the general will of a political community, specifically as expressed by that community's sovereign. Rousseau maintains that the general will always tends toward the common good, though he concedes that democratic deliberations of individuals will not always express the general will. Furthermore, Rousseau distinguished between the general will and the will of all, stressing that while the latter is simply the sum total of each individual's desires, the former is the "one will which is directed towards their common preservation and general well-being." Political authority, to Rousseau, should be understood as legitimate only if it exists according to the general will and toward the common good. The pursuit of the common good, then, enables the state to act as a moral community.

=== John Rawls's Theory of Justice ===
John Rawls defines the common good as "certain general conditions that are ... equally to everyone's advantage". In his Theory of Justice, Rawls argues for a principled reconciliation of liberty and equality, applied to the basic structure of a well-ordered society, which will specify exactly such general conditions. Starting with an artificial device he calls the original position, Rawls defends two particular principles of justice by arguing that these are the positions reasonable persons would choose were they to choose principles from behind a veil of ignorance. Such a "veil" is one that essentially blinds people to all facts about themselves so they cannot tailor principles to their own advantage. According to Rawls, ignorance of these details about oneself will lead to principles that are fair to all. If an individual does not know how he will end up in his own conceived society, he is likely not going to privilege any one class of people, but rather develop a scheme of justice that treats all fairly. In particular, Rawls claims that those in the original position would all adopt a "maximin" strategy which would maximize the prospects of the least well-off individual or group. In this sense, Rawls's understanding of the common good is intimately tied with the well-being of the least advantaged. Rawls claims that the parties in the original position would adopt two governing principles, which would then regulate the assignment of rights and duties and regulate the distribution of social and economic advantages across society. The First Principle of Justice states that "First: each person is to have an equal right to the most extensive basic liberty compatible with a similar liberty for others". The Second Principle of Justice provides that social and economic inequalities are to be arranged such that "(a) they are to be of the greatest benefit to the least-advantaged members of society, consistent with the just savings principle" (the difference principle); and "(b) offices and positions must be open to everyone under conditions of 'fair equality of opportunity'".

=== In non-Western moral and political thought ===
The idea of a common good plays a role in Confucian political philosophy, which on most interpretations stresses the importance of the subordination of individual interests to group or collective interests, or at the very least, the mutual dependence between the flourishing of the individual and the flourishing of the group. In Islamic political thought, many modern thinkers have identified conceptions of the common good while endeavoring to ascertain the fundamental or universal principles underlying divine shari'a law. These fundamentals or universal principles have been largely identified with the "objectives" of the shari'a (maqāṣid al-sharī'a), including concepts of the common good or public interest (maṣlaḥa 'āmma, in modern terminology). A notion of the common good arises in contemporary Islamic discussions of the distinction between the fixed and the flexible (al-thābit wa-l-mutaghayyir), especially as it relates to modern Islamic conceptions of tolerance, equality, and citizenship: according to some, for instance, universal principles carry greater weight than specific injunctions of the Qur'an, and in case of conflict, can even supersede or suspend explicit textual injunctions (naṣṣ) if this serves the common good.

== In political economic theory ==
In economics, the terms public good and common good have technical definitions. A public good is a good that is non-rivalrous and non-excludable. A common good is simply non-excludable and rivalrous. A simple typology illustrates the differences between various kinds of goods:

	Excludable	Non-excludable
Rivalrous	Private goods eg. food, clothing, parking spaces	Common-pool resources eg. fish stocks, timber
Non-rivalrous	Club goods eg. cinemas, software, private parks	Public goods eg. free-to-air television, air, national defense

The field of welfare economics studies social well-being. The approach begins with the specification of a social welfare function. The choice of a social welfare function is rooted in an ethical theory. A utilitarian social welfare function weights the well-being of each individual equally, while a Rawlsian social welfare function only considers the welfare of the least well-off individual.

Neoclassical economic theory provides two conflicting lenses for thinking about the genesis of the common good, two distinct sets of microfoundations. On one view, the common good arises due to social gains from cooperation. Such a view might appeal to the Prisoner's dilemma to illustrate how cooperation can result in superior welfare outcomes. Moreover, a cooperative equilibrium is stable in an iterated Prisoner's dilemma that is played for an indefinite period of time. Under these conditions, an individual does best by pursuing the course of action that is also optimal for society.

On the other hand, economic theory typically points to social gains from competition as a rationale for the use of markets. Thus, Smith described the "invisible hand," whereby the mechanism of the market converts individuals' self-interested activity into gains for society. This insight is formalized in the First Theorem of Welfare Economics. However, economic theory also points to market failures, including the underprovision of public goods by markets and the failure of self-interested individuals to internalize externalities. Because of these factors, purely self-interested behaviour often detracts from the common good.

There is an important conceptual difference between the sense of "a" public good, or public "goods" in economics, and the more generalized idea of "the public good" (in the sense of common good, public benefit, or public interest), "a shorthand signal for shared benefit at a societal level". In a non-economic sense, the term is often used to describe something that is useful for the public generally, such as education, although this is not a "public good" in the economic sense. However, services like education exhibit jointness of supply, i.e. the situation in which the cost of supplying a good to many users is the same, or nearly the same, as supplying it to one user. Public goods also exhibit jointness of supply, albeit with no diminishment of the benefits with increased consumption.

=== Social choice theory ===
Social choice theory studies collective decision rules. Arrow's Impossibility Theorem, an important result in social choice theory, states that no aggregative mechanism of collective choice (restricted to ordinal inputs) can consistently transform individual preferences into a collective preference-ordering, across the universal domain of possible preference profiles, while also satisfying a set of minimal normative criteria of rationality and fairness. The Gibbard-Satterthwaite theorem further demonstrates that non-dictatorial voting systems are inevitably subject to strategic manipulation of outcomes.

William H. Riker articulates the standard public choice interpretation of social choice theory, arguing that Arrow's Impossibility Theorem "forces us to doubt that the content of 'social welfare' or the 'public interest' can ever be discovered by amalgamating individual value judgments. It even leads us to suspect that no such thing as the 'public interest' exists, aside from the subjective (and hence dubious) claims of self-proclaimed saviors." Thus, Riker defends a "liberal" conception of democracy, which centers on the role of constitutional checks on government. Public choice theorists have tended to share this approach. Buchanan and Tullock pursued this program in developing the field of "constitutional political economy" in their book The Calculus of Consent.

More recent work in social choice theory, however, has demonstrated that Arrow's impossibility result can be obviated at little or no normative cost. Amartya Sen, for instance, argues that a range of social choice mechanisms emerge unscathed given certain reasonable restrictions on the domain of admissible preference profiles. In particular, requiring that preferences are single-peaked on a single dimension ensures a Condorcet winner. Moreover, many of Riker's empirical claims have been refuted.

=== Public choice theory ===
Public choice theory (sometimes called "positive political theory") applies microeconomic methodology to the study of political science in order to explain how private interests inform political activities. Whereas welfare economics, in line with classical political economy, typically assumes a public-interest perspective on policymaking, public choice analysis adopts a private-interest perspective in order to identify how the objectives of policymakers affect policy outcomes. Public choice analysis thus diagnoses deviations from the common good resulting from activities such as rent-seeking. In The Logic of Collective Action, Mancur Olson argues that public goods will tend to be underprovided due to individuals' incentives to free-ride. Anthony Downs provided an application of this logic to the theory of voting, identifying the paradox of voting whereby rational individuals prefer to abstain from voting, because the marginal cost exceeds the private marginal benefit. Downs argues further that voters generally prefer to remain uninformed due to "rational ignorance".

Public choice scholarship can have more constructive applications. For instance, Elinor Ostrom's study of schemes for the regulation of common property resources resulted in the discovery of mechanisms for overcoming the tragedy of the commons.

In many countries of the Commonwealth, charitable organizations must demonstrate that they provide a public benefit.

== In democratic theory ==
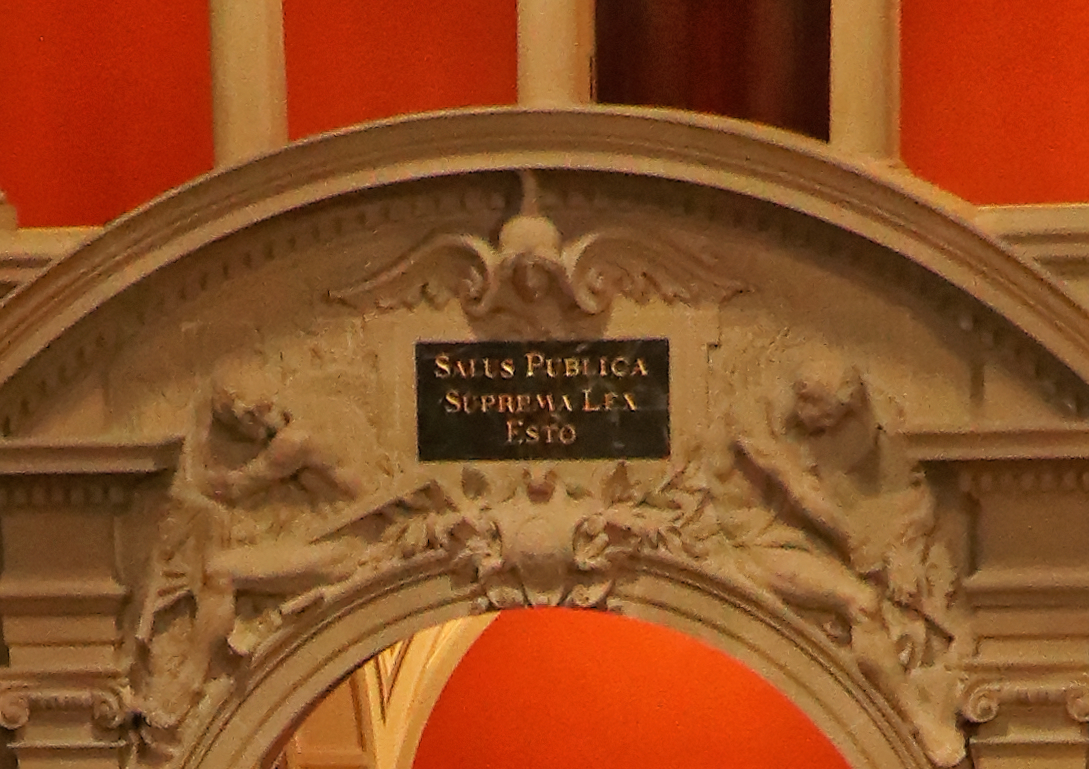
Salus publica suprema lex esto, "The common good should be the supreme law", in the Swiss Parliament

In deliberative democracy, the common good is taken to be a regulative ideal. In other words, participants in democratic deliberation aim at the realization of the common good. This feature distinguishes deliberative democracy from aggregative conceptions of democracy, which focus solely on the aggregation of preferences. In contrast to aggregative conceptions, deliberative democracy emphasizes the processes by which agents justify political claims on the basis of judgments about the common good. Epistemic democracy, a leading contemporary approach to deliberative democracy, advances a cognitivist account of the common good.

== In Catholic social teaching ==
One of the earliest references in Christian literature to the concept of the common good is found in the Epistle of Barnabas: "Do not live entirely isolated, having retreated into yourselves, as if you were already [fully] justified, but gather instead to seek together the common good."

The concept is strongly present in Augustine of Hippo's magnum opus City of God. Book XIX of this, the main locus of Augustine's normative political thought, is focused on the question, 'Is the good life social?' In other words, 'Is human wellbeing found in the good of the whole society, the common good?' Chapters 5–17 of Book XIX address this question. Augustine's emphatic answer is "yes".

Augustine's understanding was taken up and, under the influence of Aristotle, developed by Thomas Aquinas. Aquinas's conception of the common good became standard in Roman Catholic moral theology.

Against that background, the common good became a central concept in the modern tradition of Catholic social teaching, beginning with the foundational document, Rerum novarum, a papal encyclical by Pope Leo XIII issued in 1891. This addressed the crisis of the conditions of industrial workers in Europe and argued for a position different from both laissez-faire capitalism and socialism. In this letter, Pope Leo guarantees the right to private property while insisting on the role of collective bargaining to establish a living wage.

Contemporary Catholic social teaching on the common good is summarised in the 2004 Compendium of the Social Doctrine of the Church, chapter 4, part II. Quoting the Second Vatican Council document, Gaudium et spes (1965), this says, "According to its primary and broadly accepted sense, the common good indicates 'the sum total of social conditions which allow people, either as groups or as individuals, to reach their fulfilment more fully and more easily'" (#164, quoting Gaudium et spes, #26; italics original). Shortly before the promulgation of Gaudium et spes, the Council had noted that the apostolate of lay people active in public affairs has two aims, both to "further the common good" and, at the same time, to "prepare the way for the Gospel".

The Compendium later gives statements that communicate what can be seen as a partly different, more classical, sense of the concept – as not only "social conditions" that enable persons to reach fulfilment, but as the end goal of human life. "[T]he common good [is] the good of all people and of the whole person... The human person cannot find fulfilment in himself, that is, apart from the fact that he exists "with" others and "for" others" (#165; italics original). "The goal of life in society is in fact the historically attainable common good" (#168).

The Roman Catholic International Theological Commission drew attention to these two partly different understandings of the common good in its 2009 publication, In Search of a Universal Ethic: A New Look at the Natural Law. It referred to them as "two levels" of the common good.

Other relevant documents are Veritatis Splendor, a papal encyclical by Pope John Paul II, issued in 1993 to combat the relaxation of moral norms and the political corruption (see paragraph 98) that affects millions of persons, and Pope Francis' 2015 encyclical, Laudato si'. In Veritatis Splendor, Pope John Paul describes the characteristics and virtues that political leadership should require, which are truthfulness, honesty, fairness, temperance and solidarity (as described in paragraph 98 to 100), given that truth extends from honesty, good faith, and sincerity in general, to agreement with fact or reality in particular. In Laudato si', Pope Francis links the "common good" to the "integral ecology" which is a core element of his appeal for greater care for "our common home".

== In contemporary politics ==
=== United States ===
In contemporary American politics, language of the common good (or public wealth) is sometimes adopted by political actors on the progressive left to describe their values. Jonathan Dolhenty argues that one should distinguish in American politics between the common good, which may "be shared wholly by each individual in the family without its becoming a private good for any individual family member", and the collective good, which, "though possessed by all as a group, is not really participated in by the members of a group. It is actually divided up into several private goods when apportioned to the different individual members." First described by Michael Tomasky in The American Prospect magazine and John Halpin at the Center for American Progress, the American political understanding of the common good has grown in recent times. The liberal magazine The Nation and the Rockridge Institute, among others, have identified the common good as a salient political message for progressive candidates. In addition, non-partisan advocacy groups like Common Good are championing political reform efforts to support the common good.

Given the central concern for sustainable development in an increasingly interdependent world, education and knowledge should thus be considered global common goods. This means that the creation of knowledge, its control, acquisition, validation, and use, are common to all people as a collective social endeavour.

== Common goods for health ==
Common goods for health (CGH) can be defined as population-related interventions or activities that require cumulative finances from either donors or government on the basis of two conditions. The first condition is contribution in economic progress and health. The second condition includes emphasis on public or common goods and large social externalities with clear economic foundation for health interventions based on market failures. The common goods for health must produce enormous health benefits to communities and not financed through market forces. Examples of common goods for health are risk surveillance, disease control policies and strategies, vector control and public health emergency operation response services.

=== History ===
In the mid-20th century, the elites displayed a motivation for the common goods that was intended for health, and decisions were based on the elite rather than the public, since there was no public interest in the issue.

After the 1950s, the government increasingly began to see the concept of addressing mutual issues for the benefit of the citizens, but it has yet to be completely adopted and will be much more compatible with appropriate expenditure.

== See also ==
- Altruism
- Civil awareness
- Commonwealth
- Economy for the Common Good
- Higher good
- Mutualism (economic theory)
- Mutualism (movement)
- Open-source model
- Prosocial behavior
- Public benefit organization
- Public good
- Public interest
- Social contract
- Social safety net
- Summum bonum
- The commons
- Utilitarianism
- Welfare
- Welfare state

== Sources ==
- This article incorporates text from a free content work. Licensed under CC-BY-SA IGO 3.0 (license statement/permission). Text taken from Rethinking Education: Towards a global common good?, 80–81, UNESCO.
