= Sayre's law =

Inverse correlation between intensity and value in a dispute

Sayre's law states, in a formulation quoted by Charles Philip Issawi: "In any dispute the intensity of feeling is inversely proportional to the value of the issues at stake." By way of corollary, it adds: "That is why academic politics are so bitter." Sayre's law is named after Wallace Stanley Sayre, a U.S. political scientist and professor at Columbia University.

== History ==
On 20 December 1973, the Wall Street Journal quoted Sayre as: "Academic politics is the most vicious and bitter form of politics, because the stakes are so low." Political scientist Herbert Kaufman, a colleague and coauthor of Sayre, has attested to Fred R. Shapiro, editor of The Yale Book of Quotations, that Sayre usually stated his claim as "The politics of the university are so intense because the stakes are so low", and that Sayre originated the quip by the early 1950s.

Many other claimants attach to the thought behind Sayre's law. According to Arthur S. Link, Woodrow Wilson frequently complained about the personalized nature of academic politics, asserting that the "intensity" of academic squabbles was a function of the "triviality" of the issue at hand. Harvard political scientist Richard Neustadt (Sayre's former colleague at Columbia University) was quoted to a similar effect: "Academic politics is much more vicious than real politics. We think it's because the stakes are so small." In his 1979 book Peter's People and Their Marvelous Ideas, Laurence J. Peter stated "Peter's Theory of Entrepreneurial Aggressiveness in Higher Education" as: "Competition in academia is so vicious because the stakes are so small." Another proverbial form is: "Academic politics are so vicious precisely because the stakes are so small." This observation is routinely attributed to Henry Kissinger who in a 1997 speech at the Ashbrook Center for Public Affairs at Ashland University, said: "I formulated the rule that the intensity of academic politics and the bitterness of it is in inverse proportion to the importance of the subject they're discussing. And I promise you at Harvard, they are passionately intense and the subjects are extremely unimportant."

Variations on the same thought have also been attributed to scientist-author C. P. Snow, professor-politician Daniel Patrick Moynihan, Business Analyst Cyril Northcote Parkinson, and politician Jesse Unruh, among others.

== See also ==
- List of eponymous laws – Adages and sayings named after a person
- Law of triviality – Focusing on what is irrelevant but easy to understand
- Murphy's law – Adage that anything that can go wrong will go wrong
- Narcissism of small differences – Over-focus on minor social differences
- Peter principle – Management concept by Laurence J. Peter
