= Selection by survival =

Evolutionary mechanism

Selection by Survival, also called Persistence Through Time or Stability Based Sorting is a proposed mechanism of natural selection that applies to non-reproducing systems like clonal organisms, holobionts, clades, entire ecosystems or even all of life on Earth. Such systems do not fit neatly within classical Darwinism, which requires that the entities subject to evolution reproduce with heritable variation rather than simply persist through time.

The idea was first formalised by Bouchard drawing inspiration from the work of noted evolutionary theorist Leigh Van Valen. The idea has also been developed by Ford Doolittle, especially its application to group selection and the Gaia hypothesis.

== Basic Idea ==
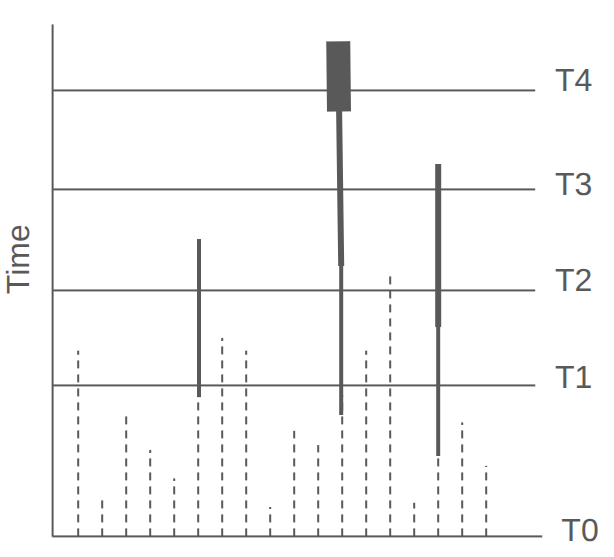
Selection by survival schematic after. Each dotted line represents one persistent 'entity'. These entities persist for some random amount of time. Occasionally an entity can acquire a persistence enhancing mechanism (solid line) with more such mechanisms being acquired over time. The fraction of systems such mechanisms increases over time.

Following consider a fixed number of potentially immortal but non-reproducing entities. These entities do not compete but can randomly 'die'. If the entities do not change their survival is simply random chance. However if 'survival enhancing mechanisms', such as diversity, geographic spread or size, can arise then systems which happen to live longer have more chances to acquire these mechanisms and thereby live longer and so on ad infinitum.

This is analogous to Darwinian natural selection with fitness replaced by persistence. Over time, individuals with persistence enhancing traits will make up a larger fraction of the total population of entities in a similar way as individuals (or genotypes) which enhance reproductive fitness tend to dominate a Darwinian system over time.

== Applications ==
The giant quaking aspen Pando, which encompasses over 100 acres and is between 9,000 and 16,000 years old, is discussed by Bouchard. According to Bouchard, by clonal growth Pando can exclude other organisms from seeding a patch. By growing larger Pando enhances its ability to survive grazing by moose and deer. It also accumulates a type of variation, where the position of different parts is 'passed on' to the successor parts and different positions may have different advantages, like soil pH. These are persistence enhancing mechanisms which Pando accumulated, which other clonal aspen groves did not, explaining Pando's survival.

Applied to the Gaia Hypothesis, the persisting entities are postulated to be biogeochemical cycles. Other authors propose a related idea called sequential selection where the entity in question (Gaia) undergoes a series of resets, where, by definition, the unstable periods are short and the stable periods are long. During the long stable periods persistence enhancing innovations can accumulate.

Various other phenomena are proposed to be due to or maintained by selection by survival such as: sexual reproduction, altruism, lateral gene transfer or even cultural phenomena such as the 'freezing' of institutions.
