= Driffill =

Driffill is a surname. Notable people with the surname include:

- John Driffill (fl. 1976), English economist
- William Ralph Driffill (1870–1922), English organist and composer
