= Wallace S. Sayre =

- Born: June 24, 1905; Point Pleasant, West Virginia
- Died: May 18, 1972 (aged 66); Manhattan, New York City

Academic background
- Education: Marshall University (BA); New York University (PhD)

Academic work
- Discipline: Political science
- Institutions: New York University; Cornell University; Columbia University

Wallace Stanley Sayre (June 24, 1905 – May 18, 1972) was an American political scientist who taught at Columbia University and was considered a leading authority on New York City politics by The New York Times. He is most famous for being the namesake of Sayre's law.

== Biography ==
Sayre was born in Point Pleasant, West Virginia, on June 24, 1905. He received his B.A. from Marshall University, and his M.A. and Ph.D. from New York University, where he wrote his dissertation on the La Follette family of Wisconsin.

From 1938 to 1942, he was a member of the New York City Civil Service Commission. He was ousted by Fiorello La Guardia after criticizing the political motivations of the mayor's appointments.

From 1942 to 1946, he held posts in the Office of Price Administration becoming director of personnel.

He subsequently taught at New York University, Cornell University and City College of New York, before moving to Columbia University in 1954, where he was the Eaton Professor of Public Administration until his death.

At Columbia, Sayre wrote the 815-page book Governing New York City with Herbert Kaufman that discussed the stakeholders and dynamics of New York City's political system.

Sayre suffered a heart attack when he was in private conversation with mayor John Lindsay on May 18, 1972. He was pronounced dead at Beekman Downtown Hospital that morning.
