= Inverted U =

Inverted U may refer to:

- Calmfors–Driffill hypothesis, an economic theory describing the relationship between collective bargaining and employment
- Kuznets curve, an economic theory describing the relationship between income per capita and wealth inequity
- Yerkes–Dodson law, a concept in psychology, describing the relationship between arousal and performance
- ∩ (U+2229 in Unicode); also $\cap$, the mathematical symbol for Intersection (set theory)
- A shape used to describe narrative structure, specifically the shape for a tragedy
