= Higher good =

Higher good is a "good" that is shared and beneficial for all (or most) members of a given community. An example might be an art collector donating their collections to a public museum so all could enjoy the artwork rather than just those privileged enough to see it in private. This is also how the higher good is broadly defined in philosophy, ethics, and political science.

== See also ==
- Altruism
- Common good
- Good and evil
- Progress
