= Law of triviality =

Focusing on what is irrelevant but easy to understand

The law of triviality is C. Northcote Parkinson's 1957 argument that people within an organization commonly give disproportionate weight to trivial issues. Parkinson provides the example of a fictional committee whose job was to approve the plans for a nuclear power plant spending the majority of its time on discussions about relatively minor but easy-to-grasp issues, such as what materials to use for the staff bicycle shed, while neglecting the proposed design of the plant itself, which is far more important and a far more difficult and complex task.

The law has been applied to software development and other activities. The terms bicycle-shed effect, bike-shed effect, and bike-shedding were coined based on Parkinson's example; it was popularized in the Berkeley Software Distribution community by the Danish software developer Poul-Henning Kamp in 1999 and, due to that, has since become popular within the field of software development generally.

== Argument ==
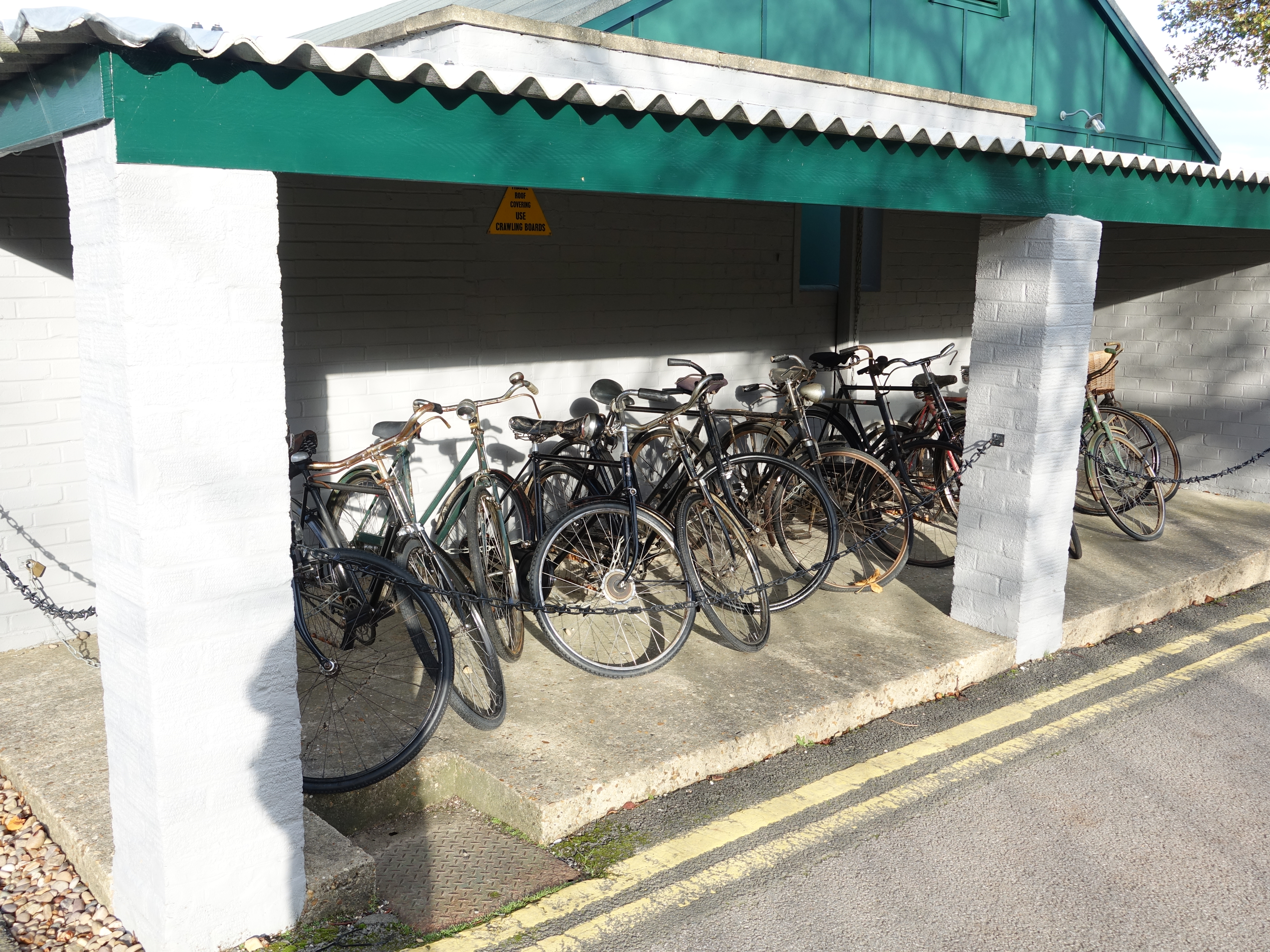
A bicycle shed

The concept was first presented as a corollary of his broader "Parkinson's law" spoof of management. He dramatizes this "law of triviality" with the example of a committee's deliberations on an atomic reactor, contrasting it with deliberations on a bicycle shed. As he put it: "The time spent on any item of the agenda will be in inverse proportion to the sum [of money] involved."

A reactor is so vastly expensive and complicated that an average person cannot understand it (see ambiguity aversion), so one assumes that those who work on it understand it. However, everyone can visualize a cheap, simple bicycle shed, so planning one can result in endless discussions because everyone involved wants to implement their own proposal and demonstrate personal contribution.

After a suggestion of building something new for the community, like a bike shed, problems arise when everyone involved argues about the details. This is a metaphor indicating that it is not necessary to argue about every little feature based simply on having the knowledge to do so. Hence, the amount of noise generated by a change is inversely proportional to the complexity of the change.

Behavioural research has produced evidence which confirms theories proposed by the law of triviality. People tend to spend more time on small decisions than they should, and less time on big decisions than they should. A simple explanation is that during the process of decision-making, one has to assess whether enough information has been collected to make the decision.

If people make mistakes about whether they have enough information, then they will tend to feel overwhelmed by large and complex matters and stop collecting information too early to adequately inform the decision. The reason is that big decisions require collecting information for a long time and working hard to understand its complex ramifications. This leaves more of an opportunity to make a mistake and stop, before getting enough information. Conversely, for small decisions, where people should devote little attention and act without hesitation, they may inefficiently continue to ponder for too long, partly because they are better able to understand the subject.

== Example ==
In the third chapter, "High Finance, or the Point of Vanishing Interest", Parkinson writes about a fictional finance committee meeting with a three-item agenda: The first is the signing of a £10 million contract to build a reactor, the second a proposal to build a £350 bicycle shed for the clerical staff, and the third proposes £21 a year to supply refreshments for the Joint Welfare Committee.

1. The £10 million number is too big and too technical, and it passes in two and a half minutes. One committee member proposes a completely different plan, which nobody is willing to accept as planning is advanced, and another who understands the topic has concerns, but does not feel that he can explain his concerns to the others on the committee.
2. The bicycle shed is a subject understood by the board, and the amount within their life experience, so committee member Mr Softleigh says that an aluminium roof is too expensive and they should use asbestos. Mr Holdfast wants galvanized iron. Mr Daring questions the need for the shed at all. Holdfast disagrees. Parkinson then writes: "The debate is fairly launched. A sum of £350 is well within everybody's comprehension. Everyone can visualise a bicycle shed. Discussion goes on, therefore, for forty-five minutes, with the possible result of saving some £50. Members at length sit back with a feeling of accomplishment."
3. Parkinson then described the third agenda item, writing: "There may be members of the committee who might fail to distinguish between asbestos and galvanised iron, but every man there knows about coffee – what it is, how it should be made, where it should be bought – and whether indeed it should be bought at all. This item on the agenda will occupy the members for an hour and a quarter, and they will end by asking the secretary to procure further information, leaving the matter to be decided at the next meeting."

== Psychological factors ==
Organizational psychologists and behavioural researchers often link the law of triviality directly to the neurological concept of an amygdala hijack. When an individual or a committee faces a task that triggers intense anxiety or fear of failure, the brain's emotional centre registers the project as a psychological threat, bypassing the logical neocortex. As a result, the group or individual defaults to "bike-shedding"—retreating into the cognitive safety of minor, easily understood details to achieve immediate emotional relief and a false sense of accomplishment.

== Related principles and formulations ==
There are several other principles, well known in specific problem domains, which express a similar sentiment.

Sayre's law is a more general principle, which holds, among other formulations, that "In any dispute, the intensity of feeling is inversely proportional to the value of the issues at stake"; many formulations of the principle focus on academia.

Wadler's law, named after computer scientist Philip Wadler, is a principle which asserts that the bulk of discussion on programming-language design focuses on syntax (which, for purposes of the argument, is considered a solved problem), as opposed to semantics.

== See also ==
- Analysis paralysis
- Attention inequality
- Busy work
- Dunning–Kruger effect
- Fredkin's paradox
- How many angels can dance on the head of a pin?
- List of eponymous laws
- Narcissism of small differences
- Omission bias
- Peter principle
- Procrastination
- Scope neglect
- Student syndrome
- Time management
- Tyranny of small decisions
- Zero-risk bias
