= Coordination failure =

Coordination failure may refer to:

- Coordination failure, in game theory, a possible outcome in the coordination game
- Coordination failure (political science)
- Coordination failure (economics)
