= Common good (economics) =

One of the four main types of goods

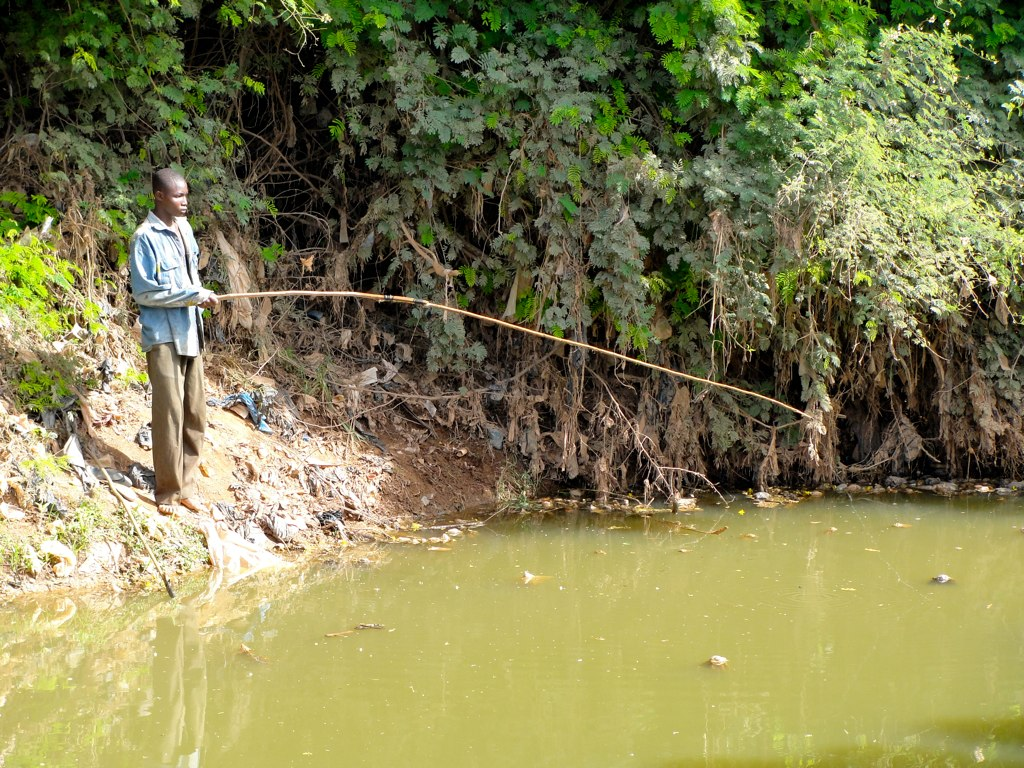
Wild fish are an example of common goods. They are non-excludable, as it is impossible to prevent people from catching fish. They are, however, rivalrous, as the same fish cannot be caught more than once.

Common goods (also called common-pool resources) are defined in economics as goods that are rivalrous and non-excludable. Thus, they constitute one of the four main types based on the criteria:

- whether the consumption of a good by one person precludes its consumption by another person (rivalrousness)
- whether it is possible to prevent people (consumers) who have not paid for it from having access to it (excludability)

As common goods are accessible by everybody, they are at risk of being subject to overexploitation which leads to diminished availability if people act to serve their own self-interests.

== History ==
Despite its growing importance in modern society, the concept of the common good was first mentioned more than two thousand years ago in the writings of Plato, Aristotle, and Cicero. Regardless the time period Aristotle described the problem with common goods accurately: “What is common to many is taken least care of, for all men have greater regard for what is their own than for what they possess in common with others.”

== Examples ==
Congested roads - Roads may be considered either public or common resources. Road is public good whenever there is no congestion, thus the use of the road does not affect the use of someone else. However, if the road is congested, one more person driving the car makes the road more crowded which causes slower passage. In other words, it creates a negative externality and road becomes common good.

Clean water and air - Climate stability belongs to classic modern examples. Water and air pollution is caused by market negative externality. Water flows can be tapped beyond sustainability, and air is often used in combustion, whether by motor vehicles, smokers, factories, wood fires. In the production process these resources and others are changed into finished products such as food, shoes, toys, furniture, cars, houses and televisions.

Fish stocks in international waters - Oceans remain one of the least regulated common resources. When fish are withdrawn from the water without any limits being imposed just because of their commercial value, living stocks of fish are likely to be depleted for any later fishermen. This phenomenon is caused by no incentives to let fish for others. To describe situations in which economic users withdraw resources to secure short-term gains without regard for the long-term consequences, the term tragedy of the commons was coined. For example, forest exploitation leads to barren lands, and overfishing leads to a reduction of overall fish stocks, both of which eventually result in diminishing yields to be withdrawn periodically.

Other natural resources - Another example of a private exploitation treated as a renewable resource and commonly cited have been trees or timber at critical stages, oil, mined metals, crops, or freely accessible grazing.

Debates about sustainability can be both philosophical and scientific. However, wise-use advocates consider common goods that are an exploitable form of a renewable resource, such as fish stocks, grazing land, etc., to be sustainable in the following two cases:

- As long as demand for the goods withdrawn from the common good does not exceed a certain level, future yields are not diminished and the common good as such is being preserved as a 'sustainable' level.
- If access to the common good is regulated at the community level by restricting exploitation to community members and by imposing limits to the quantity of goods being withdrawn from the common good, the tragedy of the commons may be avoided. Common goods that are sustained through an institutional arrangement of this kind are referred to as common-pool resources.

== Tragedy of the commons ==
Tragedy of the commons is a problem in economics in which everybody has an incentive to use a resource at the expense of everyone else who uses it, with no way of preventing anyone from consuming it. Generally, the resource in question is without barriers to entry and is demanded in excess of its supply, leading to depletion of the resource.

The tragedy of the commons was originally mentioned in 1833 by the Victorian economist William Forster Lloyd, who was a member of the Royal Society. He offered the example of a hypothetical tract of shared grazing land, in which all of the villagers brought their cows to this common grazing space, resulting in overgrazing and the depletion of the resource (Lloyd, 1833). Individuals may theoretically limit their use in order to avoid depleting a shared resource, if they so chose. However, there is a problem with free riders. In situations where people rely on others to reduce their productivity. The result of everyone taking advantage of the system and making the most of it is a scenario of over-consumption.

=== Example ===
For example, imagine there are several shepherds, each with their own flock of sheep, who have access to a communal field which they all use for grazing. As the sheep graze unhindered, they deplete the overall stock of grass in the field and there is less for other sheep to consume. The tragedy is that eventually the field will become barren and will be no use to any of the shepherds.

Possible solutions include:

- Assigning property rights. This involves essentially converting what was a common-pool resource into a private good. This would prevent that over-consumption of the good as the owner(s) of the good would have an incentive to regulate their consumption in order to keep the stock of that good at a healthy level.
- Government intervention. Right to use the land can be allocated, the number of sheep in every herd can be regulated or externality made by sheep can be internalized by taxing sheep.
- Collective solutions can also be reached to solve the problem. Before English enclosure laws were enacted, there were agreements in place between lords and rural villagers to overcome this problem. Practices such as seasonal grazing and crop rotation regulated land use. Over-using the land resulted in enforceable sanctions.

== Common goods and normal goods ==
Normal goods are goods that experience an increase in demand as the income of consumers increases. The demand function of a normal good is downward sloping, which means there is an inverse relationship between the price and quantity demanded. In other words, price elasticity of demand is negative for normal goods. Common goods mean that demand and price change in the opposite direction. If something is a normal good, then the consumer's demand for the goods and the consumer's income level change in the same direction. At this time, the substitution effect and income effect will strengthen each other, so the price change will lead to the opposite direction of demand change. Then the goods must be common goods, so the normal goods must be a common goods.

== Other goods ==
	Excludable	Non-excludable
Rivalrous	Private goods eg. food, clothing, parking spaces	Common-pool resources eg. fish stocks, timber
Non-rivalrous	Club goods eg. cinemas, software, private parks	Public goods eg. free-to-air television, air, national defense

In addition to common goods, there are three other kinds of economic goods, including public goods, private goods, and club goods. Common goods that a businessman gives a thumbs up can include international fish stocks and other goods. Most international fishing areas have no limit on the number of fish that can be caught. Therefore, anyone can fish as he likes, which makes the good things not excluded. However, if there are no restrictions, fish stocks may be depleted when other fishermen arrive later. This means that fish populations are competitive. Other common commodities include water and game animals.

== See also ==
- Common-pool resource
- Social goods
- Social trap
- Somebody else's problem
- Stone Soup – a story opposite the tragedy of the commons
- Tragedy of the anticommons
- Tyranny of small decisions
- Game theory
- Public good
