= John Driffill =

Edward John Driffill is a professor of economics at Yale-NUS College, specialising in international macroeconomics and labour economics. With Lars Calmfors, he is the creator of the Calmfors–Driffill hypothesis.

== Education and career ==
Driffill received his MA from Cambridge University and his PhD from Princeton University. From 1976 to 1989 he lectured at Southampton University. Appointed professor at Queen Mary and Westfield College in 1990, he returned to Southampton University as Professor in 1992, and became professor at Birkbeck in 1999. He is currently a visiting economics professor, acting as the head of studies of Politics, Philosophy, and Economics (PPE) at Yale-NUS College in Singapore.

He is ranked top 5% author on the website IDEAS on several definitions of citations, and the Wu index.

== Works ==
- Costs of inflation, 1988
- The term structure of interest rates : structural stability and macroeconomic policy changes in the UK, 1990
- Real interest rates, nominal shocks, and real shocks, 1997
- No credit for transition : the Maastricht treaty and German unemployment, 1998
- Product market integration and wages : evidence from a cross-section of manufacturing establishments in the United Kingdom, 1998
- Delegation of monetary policy : more than a relocation of the time-inconsistency problem, 2003
- Monetary policy and lexicographic preference ordering, 2004
