= Institutional sclerosis =

Economic concept

The concept institutional sclerosis was first introduced by American economist and social scientist Mancur Olson, in his book The Rise and Decline of Nations, published in 1982. Olson argues that the number of interests groups within a society has a sclerotic effect on economic growth. It seeks to explain economic growth and performance of societies across different countries by focusing on the role of institutions - specifically interest groups.

This concept formulation builds upon Olson's previous work, the Logic of Collective Action (1965). It sets focus on the problem of collective action, where individuals are driven by social incentives to join collectives in concern of the provision of goods and services. Nevertheless, there are others, who are reluctant to contribute, whilst still benefiting from the input. The Logic thus results in individuals creating and joining smaller interest groups with the goal to prevent the Free-rider problem, as larger groups are more likely to suffer from this phenomenon.

The turnout and consequence of this logic will reveal an increase of number of interest groups. This might create a situation of political stability, however Olson argues that these groups are limited to a certain set of interest and activity that will have a static effect on the development of society. Hence, this will create a situation of distributional coalition and rent-seeking behaviour, which will eventually hinder the advancement of technology, accumulation of capital and growth. Additionally, groups will want to remain significantly small in size, to prevent problems of collective action. This means there will be little room and possibility for influence from the outside to adapt to changes and innovation. In general, he notes that societies with a higher number of interest groups are "expected to be less flexible and less innovative". This in turn will result in a sclerotic effect on growth.

The conceptualisation of institutional sclerosis has sparked an array of debate among scholars in reference to economic growth. Diverse research has covered a variety of topics, but many have agreed to the fact that Olson will always be most closely connected to interest group formation and their macroeconomic consequences. A recent study on institutional volatility has shown that institutional sclerosis remains to be a concept of relevance in present research on understanding economic growth. It argues that it will be relevant for a country to be in a phase of institutional sclerosis to undergo institutional volatility.

== History ==
The idea of institutional sclerosis was first applied by Olson to provide an explanation for the divergence in growth rates of post World War II winners and losers. This can be connected in more specifically understanding the rise and decline of nations. During these times, countries like Germany and Japan suffered great loses especially in terms of their economy. However, not many years later the economies in both Germany and Japan were described as economic miracles.

In looking at these two cases Olson derived that politically weak nations such as Germany and Japan had the ability to enjoy prosperity through rapid growth, whereas a country like Great Britain was struggling with increase of growth. In his research on economic growth he therefore empirically demonstrated that economic growth can be measured through the advancement of technology, accumulation of knowledge and capital. Thus, institutional sclerosis offers a description to understand the measures that hinder economic growth.

== Implication ==
Societies or individual institutions that fail to adapt and change at a sufficient pace are sometimes described as displaying institutional sclerosis. It is associated with continuity and stability, and may hamper economic growth.

The concept implies that economic growth can be measured and linked to the number of interest groups within a country. This means that politically stable economies allow room for more interest groups. However, at the same time the high number of interest groups has a negative effect on the growth rate, as the country is less likely to adapt to structural shifts.

=== National level ===
The American political economist Mancur Olson, in his 1984 book, "The Rise and Decline of Nations", first offered "institutional sclerosis" as a partial explanation for the divergent growth rates experienced between the winners (with relatively low post-war growth rates) and losers (with relatively high post-war growth rates) of World War II. In liberal democracies experiencing continuity and stability, interest groups form over time and grow to exact rents, becoming vested. The accumulation of vested interests and rent-seekers ultimately slows the ability of a government to reform, adapt, and secure perfectly competitive markets thanks to a related phenomenon studied by Olson: the collective action problem. This sclerosis saps an economy's dynamism and lowers growth rates. In liberal democracies with young institutions, by contrast, competition remains perfect and natural economic dynamism and creative destruction ensue, generating high growth.

=== Institutional level ===
Institutional sclerosis may also be applied to an institution that is effective in changing in some areas but unable to adjust to changes in other areas. Institutions can evolve efficiently either by expanding original goals to meet a changing environment or by including more members. At the same time, however, institutions or organizations face difficulties adjusting to new structures or internal policies.
