= Tyranny of small decisions =

Economic phenomenon

The tyranny of small decisions is a phenomenon in which a number of decisions, individually small and insignificant in size and time perspective, cumulatively result in a larger and significant outcome which is neither optimal nor desired. The concept was first explored in an essay of the same name, published in 1966 by the American economist Alfred E. Kahn. The article describes a situation where a series of small, individually rational decisions can negatively change the context of subsequent choices, even to the point where desired alternatives are irreversibly destroyed. Kahn described the problem as a common issue in market economics which can lead to market failure. The concept has since been extended to areas other than economic ones, such as environmental degradation, political elections and health outcomes.

== Ithaca railroad ==
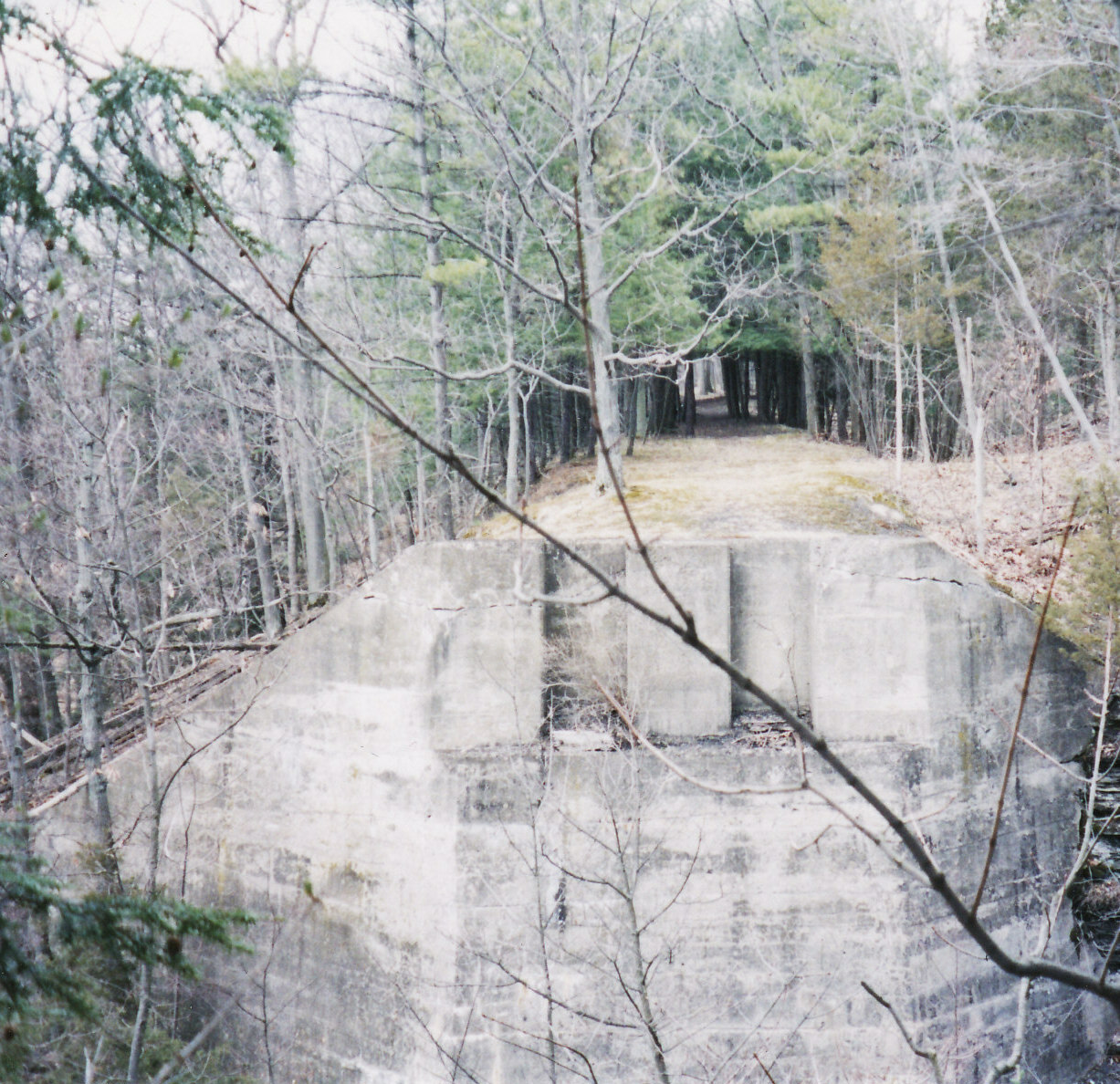
Abutment of the Ithaca-Auburn Short Line bridge

The event that first suggested the tyranny of small decisions to Kahn was the withdrawal of passenger railway services in Ithaca, New York. The railway was the only reliable way to get in and out of Ithaca. It provided services regardless of conditions, in fair weather and foul, during peak seasons and off-peak seasons. The local airline and bus company skimmed the traffic when conditions were favourable, leaving the trains to fill in when conditions were difficult. The railway service was eventually withdrawn, because the collective individual decisions made by travellers did not provide the railway with the revenue it needed to cover its incremental costs. According to Kahn, this suggests a hypothetical economic test of whether the service should have been withdrawn.

Suppose each person in the cities served were to ask himself how much he would have been willing to pledge regularly over some time period, say annually, by purchase of prepaid tickets, to keep rail passenger service available to his community. As long as the amount that he would have declared (to himself) would have exceeded what he actually paid on the period–and my own introspective experiment shows that it would–then to that extent the disappearance of the passenger service was an incident of market failure.

The failure to reflect the full value to passengers of keeping the railroad service available had its origins in the discrepancy between the time perception within which the travellers were operating, and the time perception within which the railroad was operating. The travellers were making many short term decisions, deciding each particular trip whether to go by the railroad, or whether to go instead by car, bus or the local airline. Based on the cumulative effects of these small decisions, the railroad was making one major long run decision, "virtually all-or-nothing and once-and-for-all": whether to retain or abandon its passenger service. Taken one at a time, each small travel decision made individually by the travellers had a negligible impact on the survivability of the railroad. It would not have been rational for a traveller to consider the survival of the railroad imperilled by any one of his particular decisions.

The fact remains that each selection of x over y constitutes also a vote for eliminating the possibility thereafter of choosing y. If enough people vote for x, each time necessarily on the assumption that y will continue to be available, y may in fact disappear. And its disappearance may constitute a genuine deprivation, which customers might willingly have paid something to avoid. The only choice the market offered travellers to influence the longer-run decision of the railroad was thus shorter in its time perspective, and the sum total of our individual purchases of railroad tickets necessary added up to a smaller amount, than our actual combined interest in the continued availability of rail service. We were victims of the "tyranny of small decisions".

== Environmental degradation ==
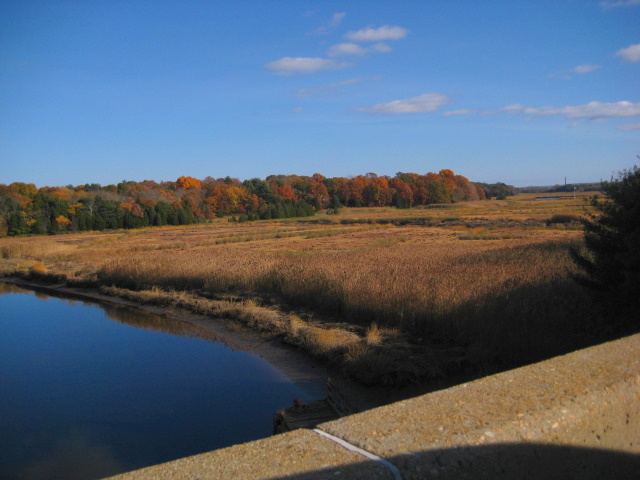
As a result of many small decisions, and without the issue being directly addressed, nearly half the marshlands were destroyed along the coasts of Connecticut and Massachusetts.

In 1982, estuarine ecologist William Odum published a paper where he extended the notion of the tyranny of small decisions to environmental issues. According to Odum, "much of the current confusion and distress surrounding environmental issues can be traced to decisions that were never consciously made, but simply resulted from a series of small decisions."

Odum cites, as an example, the marshlands along the coasts of Connecticut and Massachusetts. Between 1950 and 1970, almost 50 percent of these marshlands were destroyed. This was not purposely planned, and the public may well have supported preservation had they been asked. Instead, hundreds of small tracts of marshland were converted to other purposes through hundreds of small decisions, resulting in a major outcome without the overall issue ever being directly addressed.

Another example is the Florida Everglades. These have been threatened, not by a single unfavorable decision, but by many independent pin prick decisions, such as decisions to add individual wells, drainage canals, retirement villages, and roadways. No explicit decision was made to restrict the flow of surface water into the glades, or to encourage hot, destructive fires and intensify droughts, yet this has been the outcome.

With few exceptions, threatened and endangered species owe their predicament to series of small decisions. Polar bears, humpback whales and bald eagles have suffered from the cumulative effects of single decisions to overexploit or convert habitats. The removal, one by one, of green turtle nesting beaches for other uses parallels the decline in green turtle populations.

Cultural lake eutrophication is rarely the result of an intentional decision. Instead, lakes eutrophy gradually as a cumulative effect of small decisions; the addition of this domestic sewage outfall and then that industrial outfall, with a runoff that increases steadily as this housing development is added, then that highway and some more agricultural fields. The insidious effects of small decisions marches on; productive land turns to desert, groundwater resources are overexploited to the point where they can't recover, persistent pesticides are used and tropical forests are cleared without factoring in the cumulative consequences.

== Avoidance ==
Considering all of the pressures and short-term rewards that guide society toward simple solutions, it seems safe to assume that the "tyranny of small decisions" will be an integral part of environmental policy for a long time to come. – William Odum

An obvious way to avoid the tyranny of small decisions is to develop and protect appropriate upper levels of decision-making. Depending on the issue, decision-making may be appropriate at a local, state, country or global level. However, organisations at these levels can entangle themselves in their own bureaucracy and politics, assigning decisions by default back to the lower levels. Political and scientific systems can encourage small decisions by rewarding specific problems and solutions. It is usually easier and more politic to make decisions on individual tracts of land or single issues rather than implementing large-scale policies. The same pattern applies with academic science. Most scientists are more comfortable working on specific problems rather than systems. This reductionist tendency towards the small problems is reinforced in the way grant monies and academic tenure are assigned.

Odum advocates that at least some scientists should study systems so the negative consequences that result when many small decisions are made from a limited perspective can be avoided. He says there is a similar need for politicians and planners to understand large-scale perspectives. Odum says that environmental science teachers should include large-scale processes in their courses, with examples of the problems that decision making at inappropriate levels can introduce.

== See also ==
- Creeping normality
- Externality
- Fabian strategy
- Fredkin's paradox
- Free rider problem
- Greedy algorithm
- Law of triviality
- Overexploitation
- Path dependence
- Price of anarchy
- Race to the bottom
- Rational choice theory
- Social dilemma
- Social trap
- Technical debt
- The Paradox of Choice: Why More Is Less
- Tragedy of the commons
- Unscrupulous diner's dilemma

== Bibliography ==
- Haraldsson, HV; Sverdrup, HU; Belyazid, S; Holmqvist, J; Gramstad, RCJ (January–February 2008). "The Tyranny of Small Steps: a reoccurring behaviour in management". Systems Research and Behavioral Science. 25 (1).
