= Fredkin's paradox =

Decision making paradigm

Fredkin's paradox reads "The more equally attractive two alternatives seem, the harder it can be to choose between them—no matter that, to the same degree, the choice can only matter less." Thus, a decision-making agent might spend the most time on the least important decisions.

It was proposed by American physicist Edward Fredkin. The paradox arises from the negative correlation between the difference between two options and the difficulty of deciding between them. Developed further, the paradox constitutes a major challenge to the possibility of pure instrumental rationality.

== Responses ==
An intuitive response to Fredkin's paradox is to calibrate decision-making time with the importance of the decision: to calculate the cost of optimizing into the optimization, a version of the value of information. However, this response is self-referential and spawns a new, recursive paradox: the decision-maker must now optimize the optimization of the optimization, and so on.

== See also ==
- Buridan's ass
- Decision theory
- Cybernetics
- Law of triviality (bicycle shedding)
- Tyranny of small decisions
- What the Tortoise Said to Achilles
