= Stationary bandit theory =

Theory of the origin of the state

The theory of the stationary bandit is a political economy theory explaining the origins of the state, primarily developed by the American economist Mancur Olson. The core idea was further formalized in collaboration with Martin C. McGuire.

Under conditions of anarchy, "roving bandits" engage in uncoordinated theft, destroying incentives to invest and produce. A bandit who settles and monopolizes theft—becoming a "stationary bandit"—gains an "encompassing interest" in the territory's prosperity, leading to regular taxation rather than total plunder, provision of public goods (such as protection), and encouragement of economic growth. This transition is seen as a key step in state formation.

The theory has been applied to the analysis of warlord states and fragile political orders.

== Basic principles ==
In this theory, the emerging state is equated with a "stationary bandit" who decides to settle in a specific territory, unilaterally control it, and generate income from the population (carry out robberies) in the long term. This distinguishes the stationary bandit from "roving bandits", whose goal is to extract maximum benefit in the short term, destroying the incentive for investment and production.

As the stationary bandit expects to remain in control long enough to benefit from the territory's economic growth, he is incentivized to set a level of taxation that leaves sufficient resources for the population to use for accumulation, investment, and subsequent increases in production. The stationary bandit is also incentivized to provide public goods, such as peace and security from other bandits, as a productive population is a more lucrative source of tax revenue.

=== Autocracy ===
For an autocrat, the main threat is losing power, either through revolution or conquest by a rival bandit. The solution to this problem in history is often the establishment of a dynastic form of governance, which lengthens the autocrat's time horizon and strengthens incentives to protect the territory's long-term productivity. Lacking confidence in the stability of his rule, a stationary bandit may revert to a roving bandit's behavior, seeking to maximize short-term extraction without regard for the population's welfare or economic growth.

=== Democracy ===
Olson holds that leaders of a democracy, like stationary bandits, are guided primarily by their own self-interest. However, democratic institutions create a different set of incentives. A leader needs the support of the majority to win elections, which requires lower tax rates and a greater provision of public goods than an autocrat would provide. Democratic rulers thus retain a smaller share of the social surplus for themselves. However, Olson also notes that under democracy, the process of decision-making and redistribution of national income is influenced by various interest groups, which may lobby for decisions that do not serve the interests of the majority.

== Critique of other theories ==
The stationary bandit theory includes criticisms to refute other theories of state formation.

=== Marxism ===
Marx's theory of the state links the origin of the state to the emergence of private property. The property owners form a class which creates the state for governance, increasing their own well-being while suppressing and exploiting the class which does not own property. Olson finds fault in this concept, as he does not believe that classes represent "organized groups with common interests" that drive them to start a revolutionary struggle. He argued that individuals often avoid engaging in class struggle as they are primarily guided by personal interests; it is sometimes more beneficial for an individual not to make efforts to change the social order, but to remain on the sidelines.

=== Social contract theory ===
Olson also critiques social contract theory (Locke, Hobbes, Rousseau, etc.), according to which the state arises as a voluntary union where individuals yield some of their rights to the state in exchange for security and prosperity. Olson casts doubt on the viability of such voluntary collective action in large groups due to the free-rider problem, in which individuals have an incentive to benefit from public goods without contributing to their cost. This leads to the underproduction of public goods and low economic productivity, as individuals lack the incentive to increase their contribution to the common good.

== Criticisms ==
=== Assumptions of state formation ===
While the theory explains why a population would prefer a stationary bandit to a roving one, the motives that lead a roving bandit to become stationary are not fully explained. In an anarchic, competitive looting environment, the mechanism by which one bandit successfully monopolizes theft within a territory is unclear. If one assumes that roving bandits seek to increase profits by subduing populations already under the control of other bandits, this implies that some local proto-states already exist, which contradicts the theory's starting point of pure anarchy.

=== Role of the state ===
The stationary bandit theory treats the state as a unitary actor possessing a monopoly on violence. According to Douglass North, this approach is fundamentally flawed. First, the state governs society through a range of complex and specialized organizations, and the dynamics of relations between political elites in the ruling coalition also influence state-society interactions. Second, the theory overlooks the fundamental problem of how the state acquires its monopoly on violence in the first place—that is, how the dominant coalition that structures the state and society emerges.

=== Problem of definitions ===
As a historical case study, Olson points to the Warlord Era in China (1916–1928), when the country was controlled by various military strongmen who plundered the population. One warlord, Feng Yuxiang, subdued others and established control over significant territories. According to Olson's theory, this is how a state emerges. However, some researchers find the application of the term "state" unjustified, as the ability to collect tribute from subjects does not automatically constitute state formation. This may instead represent the emergence of a "quasi-state"—an organization with a comparative advantage in violence over a territory, but not yet a true state.
