= Lars Calmfors =

Swedish economist

Lars Calmfors, born on July 12, 1948, in Stockholm is a Swedish economist and professor emeritus in international economics at the Institute for International Economic Studies at Stockholm University. He has been active there since 1974 (as a professor from 1988 to 2015, deputy director from 1988 to 1995, and director from 1995 to 1997). He is a senior researcher at the Research Institute of Industrial Economics, IFN, since 2015.

== Education ==
He received his Ph.D. from the Stockholm School of Economics in 1978.

== Career ==
Calmfors' research focuses on labour economics and macroeconomics. His most significant contributions concern wage formation, trade unions, and collective bargaining, as well as the effects of labor market policies. The most notable contribution is the formulation of the Calmfors-Driffill hypothesis in 1988 in an article co-authored with the British economist John Driffill. According to the hypothesis, there is a hump-shaped relationship between, on one hand, the degree of coordination of various collective agreements and, on the other hand, wage levels and unemployment. Both decentralised bargaining at the company level and coordinated bargaining at the national level can lead to wage restraint. In company-level agreements, competitive pressure on individual companies has a restraining effect, while in nationally coordinated agreements, the parties have strong incentives to consider the broader economic impact (to internalise externalities). In uncoordinated sector-level bargaining, neither competitive pressure nor the internalisation effects are strong enough to promote wage moderation. Sector-level bargaining therefore leads to higher wage levels (the "hump" in the relationship) than both decentralised and coordinated bargaining. This mechanism is stronger the less open an economy is to international competition. With greater openness, the hump becomes flatter.

Calmfors served as the chair of the Economic Council in Sweden, a scientific advisory group to the Swedish Ministry of Finance, from 1993 to 2001. During this time, he launched the journal Swedish Economic Policy Review, which was published by the councill until 2008. In 2009, the journal was transformed into the Nordic Economic Policy Review, published by the Nordic Council of Ministers. Calmfors was the chief editor of this journal from 2018 to 2020.

Calmfors chaired the Government Commission on the EMU (the Calmfors Commission), which in 1996 recommended that the Swedish government and the Swedish parliament postpone the introduction of the euro until the economic problems of high unemployment and weak public finances following the 1990s crisis were resolved. In the 2003 referendum on the introduction of the euro in Sweden, Calmfors advocated for joining but was critical of the pro-euro campaign, arguing that it exaggerated the economic benefits of euro membership.In 2024–2026 he led a new inquiry on Sweden and the euro, commissioned by the Swedish Free Enterprise Foundation, and concluded that the balance of arguments had shifted in favour of Swedish membership.

He was a member of the committee for the Sveriges Riksbank Prize in Economic Sciences in Memory of Alfred Nobel ("the Nobel Prize in economics") from 1996 to 1998 and from 2003 to 2007.

As an expert in the Government Commission on Labour Market Policy (SOU 1996:34), Calmfors proposed the establishment of an independent labour market policy evaluation authority to assess labour market policies in Sweden. Such an authority—IFAU, the Institute for Evaluation of Labour Market and Education Policy—was established in 1997. Calmfors served on its board from 1997 to 2004. In the early 2000s, he proposed the establishment of a Fiscal Policy Council in Sweden and became its first chair from 2007 to 2011. The council's task is to evaluate the government's economic policy. Calmfors and the council criticsed the center-right government's fiscal policy during the 2008 financial crisis for being too contractionary, leading to a conflict with the Minister for Finance, Anders Borg.

From 2015 to 2018, Calmfors chaired the Swedish Labour Policy Council, an independent expert group established by the Confederation of Swedish Enterprise to analyze the functioning of the labour market. The council's reports proposed, among other things, new types of low-skilled jobs with low minimum wages and reforms of the current Swedish systemof pattern bargaining, under which the manufacturing sector

Calmfors has held several international assignments, including for the European Economic Advisory Group, EEAG, at the CESifo institute (member 2003–2008 and 2011–2012, chair 2006–2008), the European Commission, the European Parliament, the OECD, the Nordic Council of Ministers, and the governments of Finland, Norway, and the United Kingdom.

Calmfors has been a member of the Royal Swedish Academy of Engineering Sciences since 1993 and the Royal Swedish Academy of Sciences since 1995, He was a member of the board of the Royal Swedish Academy of Sciences from 2001 to 2007 and of the board of the Swedish Research Council from 2007 to 2012. From 2001 to 2009, he served as chair of the scientific council of SNS, a leading Swedish think tank.

Calmfors has been an active participant in the Swedish economic policy debate. Since 2011, he has written regular columns on economic and other topics in the morning daily Dagens Nyheter. Since 2020, he has been a member of the Minister for Finance's Economic Council and since 2023, a member of the Minister for Employment's Labor Market Policy Council and the Swedish Public Employment Service's scientific council. From 2022 to 2024, he was chair of the scientific council of the think tank Fores.

== Bibliography ==
- Calmfors, Lars, Inflation in Sweden, in Krause, L.B. and W.S. Salant, eds., Worldwide Inflation – Theory and Recent Experience, Brookings Institution, 1977.
- Calmfors, Lars, Real Wages, Inflation and Unemployment in the Open Economy, in Lindbeck, A., ed., Inflation and Employment in Open Economies, North-Holland, 1979.
- Calmfors, Lars, Employment Policies, Wage Formation and Trade Union Behaviour in a Small Open Economy, Scandinavian Journal of Economics 1982:2. Reprinted in Bénassy, J-P, ed., Macroeconomics and Imperfect Competition, Edward Elgar, 1995.
- Calmfors, Lars, Work Sharing, Employment and Wages, European Economic Review, April 1985.
- Calmfors, Lars and Henrik Horn, eds.,Trade Unions, Wage Formation and Macroeconomic Stability, MacMillan, 1985.
- Calmfors, Lars and Henrik Horn, Employment Policies and Centralized Wage Setting, Economica, August 1986.
- Calmfors, Lars and John Driffill, Bargaining Structure, Corporatism and Macroeconomic Performance, Economic Policy, No. 6, 1988. Reprinted in P. N. Junankar, ed., The Economics of Unemployment, vol. III, Edward Elgar, 2000 and C. Wyplosz, ed., Thirty Years of Economic Policy, Oxford University Press, 2015.
- Calmfors, Lars, Wage Formation and Macroeconomic Policy in the Nordic Countries, SNS and Oxford University Press, 1990.
- Calmfors, Lars and Ragnar Nymoen, Real Wage Adjustment and Employment Policies in the Nordic Countries, Economic Policy, No.11, 1990.
- Calmfors, Lars and Anders Forslund, Real Wage Determination and Labour Market Policies: The Swedish Experience, Economic Journal, Vol. 101, September, 1991.
- Calmfors, Lars, Centralisation of Wage Bargaining and Macroeconomic Performance - A Survey, OECD Economic Studies, No. 21, Winter 1993.
- Calmfors, Lars, Active Labour Market Policy and Unemployment - A Framework for the Analysis of Crucial Design Features, OECD Economic Studies, No. 22, Spring 1994.
- Calmfors, Lars, Active Labour Market Policy and Unemployment - A Framework for the Analysis of Crucial Design Features, OECD Economic Studies, No. 22, Spring 1994.
- Calmfors, Lars and Harald Lang, Macroeconomic Effects of Active Labour Market Programmes in a Union Wage-setting Model, The Economic Journal, vol. 105, May 1995.
- Calmfors, Lars, Harry Flam, Nils Gottfries, Magnus Jerneck, Rutger Lindahl, Janne Haaland Matlary, Christina Nordh Berntsson, Ewa Rabinowicz and Anders Vredin, EMU - A Swedish Perspective. The Calmfors Commission, Kluwer Academic Publishers, 1997.
- Boeri, Tito, Agar Brugiavini and Lars Calmfors, eds.,The Role of Unions in the Twenty-First Century, Oxford University Press, 2001.
- Calmfors, Lars, Unemployment, Labour-Market Reform and Monetary Union, Journal of Labor Economics, vol. 19, No. 2, 2001.
- Calmfors, Lars, Fiscal Policy to Stabilise the Domestic Economy in the EMU: What Can We Learn from Monetary Policy?, CESifo Economic Studies, 2003:3.
- Calmfors, Lars, Anders Forslund and Maria Hemström, The Effects of Active Labour Market Policies in Sweden: What Is the Evidence?, in J. Agell, M.J. Keen and A.J. Weichenreider, eds., Labor Market Institutions and Public Regulation, Cambridge, MIT Press, 2004.
- Calmfors, Lars, What Remains of the Stability Pact and What Next? Sieps report, 2005:8, Stockholm.
- Calmfors, Lars and Åsa Johansson, Nominal Wage Flexibility, Wage Indexation, and Monetary Union, Economic Journal, Vol. 116, 2006.
- Calmfors, Lars and Simon Wren-Lewis, What Should Fiscal Councils Do? Economic Policy, No. 68, 2011. Reprinted in C. Wyplosz, ed., Thirty Years of Economic Policy, Oxford University Press, 2015.
- Calmfors, Lars, Girts Dimdins, Marie Gustafsson Sendén, Henry Montgomery and Ulrika Stavlöt, Why Do People Dislike Low-Wage Trade Competition with Posted Workers in the Service Sector?), Journal of Socio-Economics 47, December 2013.
- Calmfors, Lars and Anna Larsson Seim, Pattern Bargaining and Wage Leadership in a Small Open Economy, Scandinavian Journal of Economics, 2013, Vol. 115, No. 1.
- Calmfors, Lars, The Swedish Macroeconomic Framework, in Pierre, Jon, ed., Oxford Handbook of Swedish Politics, Oxford University Press, 2015.
- Calmfors, Lars, The Roles of Fiscal Rules, Fiscal Councils and Fiscal Union in EU Integration, in Badinger, H. and Nitsch, V., eds.. Handbook in the Economics of European Integration, Routledge, 2015.
- Calmfors, Lars and Nora Sánchez Gassen, eds., Integrating Immigrants into the Nordic Labour Markets, Nordic Council of Ministers, Copenhagen, 2019.
- Calmfors, Lars, Fiscal Frameworks and Fiscal Sustainability in the Nordics, Nordic Council of Ministers, Copenhagen, 2020.
- Calmfors, Lars, John Hassler and Anna Seim, Stability in the Balance - A Report on the Roles of Fiscal and Monetary Policy to the Expert Group on Public Economics, ESO Report 2023:1, Stockholm.
- Calmfors, Lars and Nora Sánchez Gassen, eds.,Economic Policy beyond the Pandemic in the Nordic Countries, Nordregio, Stockholm, 2024.
- Calmfors, Lars, Pattern Bargaining as a Means to Coordinate Wages in the Nordic Countries, Nordic Economic Policy Review, 2025.
- Calmfors, Lars, ed., Time for Swedish Euro Membership?, Swedish Free Enterprise Foundation, Stockholm, 2026.
