= Coordination failure (political science) =

Coordination failure is the electoral problem resulting from competition between two or more candidates or political parties from the same or approximate location in the political ideological spectrum or space against an opposing candidate or political party from the other side of the political ideological spectrum or space. The resulting fragmentation of political support may result in electoral defeat. Coordination failures, and thus political calculations attempting to avoid them, appear most frequently in elections involving executives and representatives from single member districts.

"Coordination Failure" in a game-theoretic context is a state of affairs in which agents' inability to coordinate their behavior (choices) leads to an outcome (equilibrium) that leaves all agents worse off than in an alternative situation that is also an equilibrium. This can occur due to lack of information, inefficiencies, or differing expectations.

== Examples ==
- Vermont Democrats debate whether to run a candidate for the United States Senate seat now held by the retiring independent Jim Jeffords rather than support Congressman Bernie Sanders. See Ross Sneyd. Vt. Governor Opts Out of U.S. Senate Bid. Associated Press. May 6, 2005. News Article.
