= Social trap =

Type of 'tragedy of the commons'

In psychology, a social trap is a conflict of interest or perverse incentive where individuals or a group of people act to obtain short-term individual gains, which in the long run leads to a loss for the group as a whole. Social traps are the cause of countless environmental issues, including overfishing, energy "brownout" and "blackout" power outages during periods of extreme temperatures, the overgrazing of cattle on the Sahelian Desert, the destruction of the rainforest by logging interests and agriculture, and, most importantly, climate change.

== Origin of the concept ==
The term social trap was first introduced to the scientific community by John Platt's 1973 paper in American Psychologist, and in a book developed in an interdisciplinary symposium held at the University of Michigan. Building upon the concept of the "tragedy of the commons" in Garrett Hardin's pivotal article in Science (1968), Platt and others in the seminar applied behavioral psychology concepts to actions of people operating in social traps. By applying the findings of basic research on "schedules of operant reinforcement" (B.F. Skinner 1938, 1948, 1953, 1957; Keller and Schoenfeld, 1950), Platt recognized that individuals operating for short-term positive gain ("reinforcement") had a tendency to over-exploit a resource, which led to a long-term overall loss to society.

The application of behavioral psychology terms to behaviors in the tragedy of the commons led to the realization that the same short-term versus long-term cause-and-effect relationship also applied to other human traps, in addition to the exploitation of commonly held resources.

== Types of social traps ==
Besides defining this psychological phenomenon, Platt also distinguishes between social traps and social fences (countertraps). Social traps represent a behavior or action which prioritizes individual gains at the expense of collective gains. Social fence refers to a short-term avoidance behavior by individuals that leads to a long-term loss to the entire group. The missing hero trap is a perfect representation of a social fence. An example is the Schelling's anecdote of a mattress that falls from a vehicle on a two lane highway. Motorists tend to back up in a traffic jam behind the mattress, waiting for a break in the oncoming traffic to pass around the mattress. Each individual motorist avoids the opportunity to exit their stopped car and pull the mattress to the side of the road. The long-term consequence of this avoidance behavior is that all of the motorists (except for perhaps one) arrived at their destinations later than they would have if an individual had removed the mattress barrier.

According to Platt, social traps can be categorized into one-person traps (self-traps) and group traps. One-person traps involve the behavior of only a single person rather than a group of people. The basic concept is that an individual's behavior for short-term reinforcers leads to a long-term loss for the individual. Examples of individual traps are tobacco smoking leading to lung cancer or alcohol ingestion leading to cirrhosis of the liver.

Group traps are situations when the whole collective becomes trapped with long-term negative consequences caused by the pursuit of self-interest by many people before. Such traps represent many current environmental issues worldwide, especially climate change. Group traps can also be viewed as collective-action problems, characterized by the cumulation of individual actions into outcomes shared within the group - to solve the problem, collective cooperation is necessary.

Further, it is possible to differentiate between temporal and social traps. Temporal traps emphasize the time dimension represented by traps: the short-term and long-term benefits and losses, only concerning individuals. In contrast, social traps highlight the individual and collective level of traps, where the time dimension is not necessarily present.

== Social dilemmas ==
The term social trap is generally less known than social dilemma. A few years after John Platt published his article, Robyn Dawes created the term social dilemma, which resembles the definition of a group social trap in almost all aspects. However, Dawes added two more characteristics: the pursuit of self-interest (defection) is more beneficial to an individual than contributing to the collective good (cooperation) regardless of other members' actions, but the overall most beneficial strategy (with the highest payoff) for everyone involved is always to cooperate. Dawes introduced the concept of social dilemmas to embrace both social traps and commons dilemmas, which have similar characteristics. Various game theory models proved to be valuable tools in testing and exploring the decision-making behavior when faced with a social dilemma. The most attention so far has been given to the well-known Prisoner's Dilemma game.

There are three main categories of social dilemmas: large-scale dilemmas, commons dilemmas (or resource dilemmas), and public goods dilemmas. Large-scale dilemmas represent classical group social traps, where seeking short-term personal benefits lead to negative consequences for the whole group. Commons dilemmas originated from Hardin's article arise when a scarce common resource shared within a collective becomes depleted because each member desires more than is fair. Lastly, the public goods dilemma describes a situation where an individual is faced with the dilemma of whether they should contribute to the shared public good (e.g., taxpayers contributing to national defense or maintenance of public parks) or free-ride on the contributions of others. In this case, everyone doesn't need to contribute; only a sufficient number does.

== First empirical test and the use of superimposed schedules of reinforcement ==
The first empirical test of the concept of social traps was by Brechner at Arizona State University, who operationalized the concepts underlying Platt et al.'s theoretical analysis. By creating a laboratory game, Brechner had groups of college students playing a game where they could accumulate points by pressing buttons for the individual short-term positive rewards of experimental credit in their introductory psychology classes. Players could see a lighted display that indicated the total quantity of points available at any given time in the experiment. Players were told that if they completely drained the pool of points, the game was over and they could not accumulate more points. By responding for points at a moderate rate all the players in the group could accumulate enough points to fulfill their entire semester's experimental requirements. But if one or more players took points for themselves at too fast a rate, the pool would be drained of points and none of the players would achieve the maximum potential experimental credit.

In building the laboratory analogy of social traps, Brechner introduced the concept of "superimposed schedules of reinforcement". Skinner and Ferster (1957) had demonstrated that reinforcers could be delivered on schedules (schedule of reinforcement), and further that organisms behaved differently under different schedules. Rather than a reinforcer, such as food or water, being delivered every time as a consequence of some behavior, a reinforcer could be delivered after more than one instance of the behavior. For example, a pigeon may be required to peck a button switch five times before food is made available to the pigeon. This is called a "ratio schedule". Also, a reinforcer could be delivered after an interval of time passed following a target behavior. An example is a rat that is given a food pellet one minute after the rat pressed a lever. This is called an "interval schedule". In addition, ratio schedules can deliver reinforcement following fixed or variable number of behaviors by the individual organism. Likewise, interval schedules can deliver reinforcement following fixed or variable intervals of time following a single response by the organism. Individual behaviors tend to generate response rates that differ based upon how the reinforcement schedule is created. Much subsequent research in many labs examined the effects on behaviors of scheduling reinforcers.

When an organism is offered the opportunity to choose between or among two or more simple schedules of reinforcement at the same time, the reinforcement structures are called "concurrent schedules of reinforcement". In creating the laboratory analogy of social traps, Brechner created a situation where simple reinforcement schedules were superimposed upon each other. In other words, a single response or group of responses by an organism led to multiple consequences. Concurrent schedules of reinforcement can be thought of as "or" schedules, and superimposed schedules of reinforcement can be thought of as "and" schedules.

To simulate social traps a short-term positive reward is superimposed upon a long-term negative consequence. In the specific experiment, the short-term positive reinforcer was earning points that applied to class credits. The long-term negative consequence was that each point earned by a player also drained the pool of available points. Responding too rapidly for short-term gains led to the long-term loss of draining the resource pool. What makes the traps social is that any individual can respond in a way that the long-term consequence also comes to bear on the other individuals in the environment.

Superimposed schedules of reinforcement have many real-world applications in addition to generating social traps (Brechner and Linder, 1981; Brechner, 1987; Brechner, 2010). Many different human individual and social situations can be created by superimposing simple reinforcement schedules. For example, a human being could have simultaneous tobacco and alcohol addictions. Even more complex situations can be created or simulated by superimposing two or more concurrent schedules. For example, a high school senior could have a choice between going to Stanford University or UCLA, and at the same time have the choice of going into the Army or the Air Force, and simultaneously the choice of taking a job with an internet company or a job with a software company. That would be a reinforcement structure of three superimposed concurrent schedules of reinforcement. An example of the use of superimposed schedules as a tool in the analysis of the contingencies of rent control can be found online in the website "Economic and Game Theory Forum", (Brechner, 2003).

== Subsequent experimentation ==
Subsequent empirical studies by other researchers explored aspects of social traps other than the underlying reinforcement structure. Studies tended to concentrate on manipulating social and cognitive variables. Cass and Edney (1978) created a simpler game using a bowl of nuts to simulate a commonly held resource. The Nuts Game as they called it had some distinct advantages over Brechner's electronically wired laboratory simulation. The Nuts Game could be transported easily to any environment in or out of the laboratory. It was simple and required no electronics. The reinforcers used were primary food rewards rather than the secondary conditioned reinforcers of class credit used in the earlier study.

From Platt's and others' initial concept, social trap research has spread to laboratories all over the world and has expanded into the fields of sociology, economics, institutional design, and the nuclear arms race. Summaries of the many other diverse studies of social traps can be found in Messick and McClelland (1983), Costanza (1984), Komorita and Parks (1995), Rothstein (2005), and in a more recent review by Van Lange et al. (2013).

Social trap research continues to be an active area. Urlacher (2008) devised an iterated version of the prisoner's dilemma game using groups of people, or "agents", pitted against other groups of agents, in a variation he termed a "two-level social trap". He reported that when using a democratic decision rule, larger groups behaved more cooperatively than smaller groups. Chuang, Rivoire, and Liebler (2009) constructed a non-mammalian commons dilemma using colonies of the bacteria Escherichia coli composed of strains of producer and nonproducer microbes that contribute (or do not contribute) to the common resource in an examination of the statistical concept of Simpson's paradox.

In 2010, Shaimaa Lazem and Denis Gračanin, in the Department of Computer Science at Virginia Tech, took social traps to a new level: into cyberspace. They performed a replication of the original social trap experiment, but created the social trap in the internet virtual world known as Second Life. They constructed a virtual experimental laboratory with the subjects responding through avatars. The findings mirrored the original study, by finding that the ability to communicate led to greater replenishment of common resources.

== Social traps and climate change ==
Social traps and dilemmas represent one of the major causes of ongoing climate change, specifically due to the conflict between self-interest and collective gain. A practical example of a social trap is when people prefer cars to public transportation - the short-term personal benefit, in this case, represents the comfort and possibly a demonstration of social status, whereas the long-term outcomes of such behavior lead to the rise in the concentration of greenhouse gas emissions in the atmosphere and thus aggravating the harmful effects of climate change. Such defecting (non-cooperative) behavior is frequently strengthened when confronted with the feeling of social and environmental uncertainty, particularly in collective social traps, large-scale dilemmas, and commons dilemmas. Social uncertainty, meaning the uncertainty of others actions, and environmental uncertainty, regarding the unpredictability of the resource's availability or abundance, generally prevent cooperation within groups and often lead to taking more than a fair share. However, research has shown that cooperative behavior under social and environmental uncertainty can be enhanced when the group chooses a trustworthy leader who manages the shared resource justly.

There appear to be many strategies to escape or avoid social traps and dilemmas, which could provide valuable input for local and global climate policies. In Platt's original article, he proposed some of those - for example, imposing rewards for proenvironmental behavior (e.g., monetary rewards) and punishments for environmentally unfriendly behavior (e.g., pollution taxes). The enforcement of pollution taxes can be very efficient, for example, in managing hazardous waste. In terms of fulfilling climate agreements and global treaties, world governments must be aware of a definite threshold (temperature, atmospheric CO_{2} concentration) that cannot be crossed. The lack thereof might lead to uncertainty, free riding on the contributions of other countries, and thus to the failure to comply with set agreements. As for promoting cooperation and proenvironmental behavior among people, research shows that people need to believe their actions count and are significant, and they should be aware of the negative consequences of their actions. Also, promoting altruism and social norms can become practical tools when attempting to escape social traps and dilemmas. Additionally, cooperation among group members increases when group identity is strengthened, and a leader is elected to manage a common resource.

== See also ==
- Braess's paradox
- Evolutionary suicide
- Externality
- Malthusian trap
- Overexploitation
- Overfishing
- Overgrazing
- Paradox of thrift
- Social dilemma
- Tragedy of the commons
- Trigger strategy
- Tyranny of small decisions
- War of attrition
- Welfare trap
- Zero-sum

== Notes ==
- Brechner, K. C. (1974). "An experimental analysis of social traps: A laboratory analog". Ph.D. Dissertation. Arizona State University.
- ——— (1977). "An experimental analysis of social traps". Journal of Experimental Social Psychology. 13 (6): 552–564. doi:10.1016/0022-1031(77)90054-3.
- ——— (1987). "Social Traps, Individual Traps, and Theory in Social Psychology". Pasadena, CA: Time River Laboratory, Bulletin No. 870001.
- ——— (2003). "Superimposed schedules of reinforcement applied to rent control". Economic and Game Theory Forum, 2003-02-18.
- ——— (2010). "A social trap analysis of the Los Angeles storm drain system: A rationale for interventions". Paper presented at the 118th convention of the American Psychological Association, San Diego.
- ——— & Linder, D. E. (1981). "A social trap analysis of energy distribution systems". In Baum, A. & Singer, J. E. (eds.). Advances in Environmental Psychology. Vol. 3. Hillsdale, NJ: Lawrence Erlbaum & Associates.
- Cass, R. & Edney, J. J. (1978). "The commons dilemma: A simulation testing the effects of resource visibility and territorial division". Human Ecology. 6 (4): 371–386. Bibcode:1978HumEc...6..371C. doi:10.1007/BF00889415. S2CID 153321517.
- Costanza, R. (1984). "Review Essay: The nuclear arms race and the theory of social traps". Journal of Peace Research. 21 (1): 79–86. doi:10.1177/002234338402100106. S2CID 53375413.
- Cross, J. G. & Guyer, M. J. (1980). Social Traps. Ann Arbor: University of Michigan Press. ISBN 0-472-06315-4.
- Edney, J. J. & Harper, C. S. (1978). "The effects of information in a resource management problem: A social trap analog". Human Ecology. 6 (4): 387–395. Bibcode:1978HumEc...6..387E. doi:10.1007/BF00889416. S2CID 154424307.
- Hardin, G. (1968). "The Tragedy of the Commons". Science. 162 (3859): 1243–1248. Bibcode:1968Sci...162.1243H. doi:10.1126/science.162.3859.1243. PMID 5699198.
- Keller, F. S. & Schoenfeld, W. N. (1950). Principles of Psychology. New York: Appleton-Century-Crofts.
- Lazem, S. & Gračanin, D. (2010). "Social Traps in Second Life". 2010 Second International Conference on Games and Virtual Worlds for Serious Applications. Paper Presented at the Second International Conference on Games and Virtual Worlds for Serious Applications. Institute of Electrical and Electronics Engineers. pp. 133–140. doi:10.1109/VS-GAMES.2010.29. ISBN 978-0-7695-3986-7. S2CID 3178663.
- Komorita, S. S. & Parks, C. D. (1996). Social dilemmas. See Chapter 4 on Social Traps. Boulder, CO: Westview Press. p. 80. ISBN 0-8133-3003-3.
- Messick, D. M. & McClelland, C. L. (1983). "Social Traps and Temporal Traps". Personality and Social Psychology Bulletin. 9 (1): 105–110. doi:10.1177/0146167283091015. S2CID 143981072.
- Platt, J. (1973). "Social Traps". American Psychologist. 28 (8): 641–651. doi:10.1037/h0035723.
- Rothstein, B. (2005). Social Traps and the Problem of Trust. Cambridge: Cambridge University Press. ISBN 0-521-61282-9.
- Skinner, B. F. (1938). The Behavior of Organisms: An Experimental Analysis. Copley Custom Textbooks. ISBN 1-58390-007-1.
- ——— (1948). Walden Two. Macmillan. ISBN 0-02-411510-X.
- ——— (1953). Science and Human Behavior. ISBN 0-02-929040-6.
- ——— (1957). Verbal Behavior. Copley Publishing. ISBN 1-58390-021-7.
- ———; Ferster, C. B. (1957). Schedules of Reinforcement. Prentice-Hall. ISBN 0-13-792309-0.
