= Narcissism of small differences =

Over-focus on minor social differences

In psychoanalysis, the narcissism of small differences (German: der Narzissmus der kleinen Differenzen) is the idea that when people in a relationship or community have a lot in common, they can actually be more likely to fight with each other and mock each other, because they become overly sensitive to small differences they notice in one another and treat those differences as bigger than they are. The term was coined by Sigmund Freud in 1917, based on the earlier work of English anthropologist Ernest Crawley. Crawley theorized that each individual is separated from others by a taboo of personal isolation, which is effectively a narcissism of minor differences.

== Usage ==
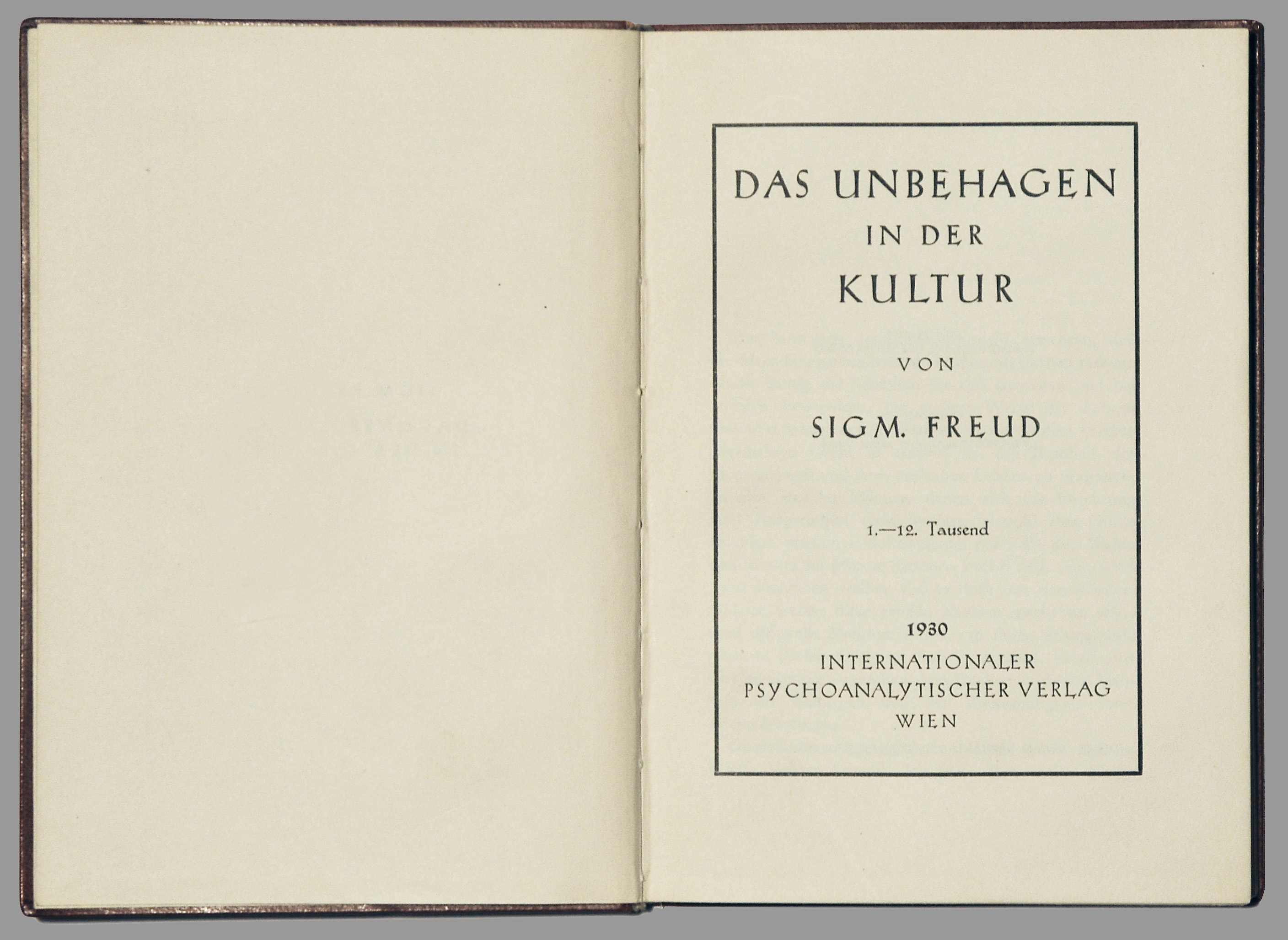
The title page of Civilization and Its Discontents, in which Freud developed his theory

The term appeared in Freud's Civilization and Its Discontents (1929–30) in relation to the application of the inborn aggression in man to ethnic (and other) conflicts, a process still considered by Freud, at that point, as a convenient and relatively harmless satisfaction of the inclination to aggression. For Lacanians, the concept clearly related to the sphere of the Imaginary: the narcissism of small differences, which situates envy as the decisive element in issues that involve narcissistic image.

American psychiatrist Glen O. Gabbard has suggested that Freud's narcissism of small differences provides a framework to understand that in a loving relationship, there can be a need to find, and even exaggerate, differences in order to preserve a feeling of separateness and self.

In terms of postmodernity, Clive Hazell argues that consumer culture has been seen as predicated on the narcissism of small differences to achieve a superficial sense of one's own uniqueness, an ersatz sense of otherness which is only a mask for an underlying uniformity and sameness.

According to Fintan O'Toole, Jonathan Swift in his 1726 novel Gulliver's Travels described this phenomenon when writing about how two groups entered into a long and vicious war after they disagreed on which was the best end to break an egg.

== See also ==
- Collective narcissism
- Identity politics
- Intragroup conflict
- Familiarity breeds contempt
- Law of triviality
- Narcissism
- Sectarianism
- The Sneetches and Other Stories and The Butter Battle Book by Dr. Seuss
- Uncanny valley
