= Calmfors–Driffill hypothesis =

Macroeconomic theory in labour economics

The Calmfors–Driffill hypothesis is a macroeconomic theory in labour economics that states that there is a direct relationship between the degree of collective bargaining in an economy and the level of unemployment. Specifically, it states that the relationship is roughly that of an 'inverted U': as trade union size increases from nil, unemployment increases, and then falls as unions begin to exercise monopoly power. It was advanced by Lars Calmfors and John Driffill.

The rationale is related to Mancur Olson's idea, from The Rise and Decline of Nations, that organised interests are at their most harmful when they do not internalise significant amounts of the costs they impose on society, but become less harmful as their interest becomes encompassing enough to suffer the costs.
