= Herbert Kaufman =

American writer

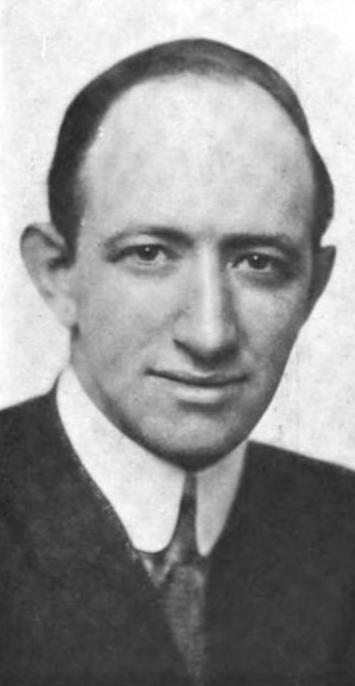
- Born: March 6, 1878; Washington, D.C.
- Died: September 6, 1947 (aged 69); Tarrytown, New York
- Occupation: Writer

Herbert Kaufman (March 6, 1878 – September 6, 1947) was an American writer and newspaperman whose editorials were widely syndicated in both the United States and Canada. During World War I, Kaufman regularly contributed articles and editorials to the Evening Standard, The Times, and other leading British periodicals, along with more than 50 war poems, including the classic The Hell-Gate of Soissons.

== Biography ==
Herbert Kaufman was born in Washington, D.C., on March 6, 1878.

He died at his home in Tarrytown, New York, on September 6, 1947.

== Works ==
Kaufman is the author of several books, including:

- The Stolen Throne (c. 1907; co-authored with May Isabel Fisk and illustrated by Howard Chandler Christy and Herman Rountree)
- The Winning Fight (c. 1910) being perhaps his most popular work
- Do Something! Be Something! (c. 1912)
- The Efficient Age (c. 1913)
- The Song of Guns (1914, reissued in 1915 as "The Hell-Gate of Soissons And Other Poems")
- The Clock that Had No Hands (c. 1912; a compilation of essays on the value of advertising)
- Neighbors (c. 1914)

Kaufman is known for his essays on success, war poetry, and "Kaufmanisms." A "Kaufmanism" is the persuasive rhetorical juxtaposition of words that reverses the subject and object of a phrase often meant to change its context and meaning, typically used to add additional emphasis to both nouns.

Select Kaufmanisms:

- "A coward can't conquer anything, because he can't conquer himself."
- "The man who won't go through to the finish has finished at the start."
- "They who fight in the dark do not shine in the light."
- "Mind your own business and in time you'll have a business of your own to mind."

=== Selected magazine bibliography ===
- "The Stainless Banner", Everybody's Magazine, June 1909.
- "America (pm)" Everybody's Magazine, January 1910.
- "The Song of the Man", Hampton's, August 1910.
- "The Living Dead", Everybody's Magazine, November 1911.
- "Fool's Gold", Everybody's Magazine, March 1913.
- "To Wilhelm the Mad", Nash's Magazine, September 1914.
- "Scum O' The Melting Pot", McClure's Magazine, April 1920
