= Mancur Olson =

American economist and political scientist (1932–1998)

- Born: Mancur Lloyd Olson Jr. January 22, 1932; Grand Forks, North Dakota, U.S.
- Died: February 19, 1998 (aged 66); College Park, Maryland, U.S.

Academic background
- Education: Harvard University (PhD); University of Oxford (MA); North Dakota State University (BA)

Academic work
- Discipline: Economics; Political science
- School or tradition: New institutional economics
- Institutions: University of Maryland; Princeton University

Mancur Lloyd Olson Jr. (/ˈmænsər/; January 22, 1932 – February 19, 1998) was an American economist and political scientist who taught at the University of Maryland, College Park. His most influential contributions were to new institutional economics, and focused on the role played by private property, taxation, public goods, collective action, and contract rights in economic development.

== Early life and education ==
Olson was born on January 22, 1932, in Grand Forks, North Dakota, to a family of Norwegian immigrants. He grew up on a farm near Buxton, North Dakota, next to the state border with Climax, Minnesota. Olson claimed that his given name, Mancur, was common throughout Scandinavian-immigrant communities in North America and was a variation of the Arabic name Mansoor.

Olson graduated from North Dakota State University in 1954, and was a Rhodes Scholar at University College, Oxford from 1954 to 1956, before earning a PhD in economics from Harvard in 1963. He also served in the U.S. Air Force for two years from 1961 to 1963.

== Career ==
While serving in the U.S. Air Force, Olson became a lecturer in the Economics Department of the United States Air Force Academy from 1961 to 1963. He then became an assistant professor at Princeton University in 1963. Afterwards, he served as Deputy Assistant Secretary of Health, Education and Welfare for two years in Washington, D.C. In 1969, he joined the economics department of the University of Maryland, College Park, where he remained until his death.

== Family life and death ==
Olson married his wife, Alison, in 1959, and the couple had three children. At the time of his death, he was a resident of College Park, Maryland.

On February 19, 1998, Olson, then 66 years of age, suddenly collapsed outside his office after returning from lunch. He never regained consciousness and died on the same day. He is buried in the cemetery of his childhood church, Grue Norwegian Lutheran, near his family's farm and hometown of Buxton, Traill County, North Dakota. The cause of death was later determined to be a heart attack.

== Legacy ==
=== Academic work ===
In his first book, The Logic of Collective Action: Public Goods and the Theory of Groups (1965), he theorized that what stimulates people to act in groups is incentive; members of large groups do not act in accordance with a common interest unless motivated by personal gain (economic, social, etc.). While small groups can act on shared objectives, large groups will not work towards shared objectives unless their individual members are sufficiently motivated.

In 1982, he expanded the scope of his earlier work in an attempt to explain The Rise and Decline of Nations (1982). He argues that groups such as trade associations, business cartels, and labor unions have an incentive to form lobby groups and influence policies in their favor. These policies will tend to be protectionist, which will hurt economic growth; but because the benefits of such policies are concentrated, and their costs are diffused throughout the whole population, there will be little public resistance to them. As distributional coalitions accumulate, nations burdened by them will fall into economic decline. His work influenced the formulation of the Calmfors–Driffill hypothesis of collective bargaining.

In his final book, Power and Prosperity (2000), Olson distinguished between the economic effects of different types of government, in particular, tyranny, anarchy, and democracy. Olson argued that under anarchy, a "roving bandit" only has the incentive to steal and destroy, whilst a "stationary bandit"—a tyrant—has an incentive to encourage some degree of economic success as he expects to remain in power long enough to benefit from that success. A stationary bandit thereby begins to take on the governmental function of protecting citizens and their property against roving bandits. In the move from roving to stationary bandits, Olson sees the seeds of civilization, paving the way, eventually for democracy, which by giving power to those who align with the wishes of the population, improves incentives for good government. Olson's work on the roving vs. stationary bandits is influential in analysis of the political and economic order structured in warlord states and societies.

=== Policy work ===
To help bring his ideas to the attention of policymakers, Olson founded the Center for Institutional Reform in the Informal Sector ("IRIS Center"), funded by USAID (United States Agency for International Development). Based at the University of Maryland, the Center sought to supply an intellectual foundation for legal and economic reform projects carried out by USAID in formerly communist states that were attempting to make the transition to market-driven democratic governments governed by the rule of law. It was particularly active in East and Central Europe and the former Soviet Union.

The center also became actively involved in projects in South America, Africa, and Asia, where it became a proponent of judicial independence. It sponsored the first conference on corruption in francophone Africa in the 1990s, when it was a very sensitive subject. The IRIS Center continued to operate after Olson's death, but was eventually folded into other programs at the University of Maryland.

To honor Olson's many contributions, the American Political Science Association established the Olson Award for the best PhD dissertation in Political Economy. In 2013 the University of Maryland announced the creation of a new endowed professorship—the Mancur Olson Professor of Economics. Maryland Professor of Economics Peter Murrell was the first Mancur Olson Professor.

== Selected works ==
=== Books ===
- The Logic of Collective Action: Public Goods and the Theory of Groups. Cambridge, Massachusetts: Harvard University Press. 1965. ISBN 0-674-53751-3.
- The No-Growth Society. New York: Norton. 1974. ISBN 0-393-01111-9.
- A New Approach to the Economics of Health Care. Washington, D.C.: American Enterprise Institute for Public Policy Research. 1981. ISBN 0-844-72212-X.
- The Rise and Decline of Nations: Economic Growth, Stagflation, and Social Rigidities. New Haven: Yale University Press. 1982. ISBN 978-0300030792.
- A Not-so-dismal Science: A Broader View of Economies and Societies. Oxford; New York: Oxford University Press. 2000. ISBN 0-198-29369-0.
- Power and Prosperity: Outgrowing Communist and Capitalist Dictatorships. New York: Basic Books. 2000. ISBN 0-465-05195-2.

=== Articles ===
- Olson, Mancur (March 1983). "Towards a Mature Social Science". International Studies Quarterly. 27 (1): 29–37. doi:10.2307/2600617. JSTOR 2600617.
- Olson, Mancur (December 1985). "Space, Agriculture, and Organization" (PDF). American Journal of Agricultural Economics. 67 (5). Agricultural & Applied Economics Association: 928–937. doi:10.2307/1241349. JSTOR 1241349.
- "The Economics of Autocracy and Majority Rule: The Invisible Hand and the Use of Force". Journal of Economic Literature. 34 (1): 72–96. March 1996. (with Martin C. McGuire)
- Olson, Mancur (September 1993). "Dictatorship, Democracy, and Development" (PDF). American Political Science Review. 87 (3): 567–576. doi:10.2307/2938736. JSTOR 2938736. S2CID 145312307.

== See also ==
- Institutional sclerosis
- Principles of Political Economy
