= Communal reinforcement =

Social phenomenon

Communal reinforcement is a social phenomenon in which a concept or idea is repeatedly asserted in a community, regardless of whether sufficient empirical evidence has been presented to support it. Over time, the concept or idea is reinforced to become a strong belief in many people's minds, and may be regarded by the members of the community as fact. Often, the concept or idea may be further reinforced by publications in the mass media, books, or other means of communication. The phrase "millions of people can't all be wrong" is indicative of the common tendency to accept a communally reinforced idea without question, which often aids in the widespread acceptance of factoids. A very similar term to this term is community-reinforcement, which is a behavioral method to stop drug addiction.

== In addiction treatment ==
The community-reinforcement approach (CRA) is a behaviourist alcoholism treatment approach that aims to achieve abstinence by eliminating positive reinforcement for drinking and enhancing positive reinforcement for sobriety. CRA integrates several treatment components, including building the client's motivation to quit drinking, helping the client initiate sobriety, analyzing the client's drinking pattern, increasing positive reinforcement, learning new coping behaviors, and involving significant others in the recovery process. These components can be adjusted to the individual client's needs to achieve optimal treatment outcome. In addition, treatment outcome can be influenced by factors such as therapist style and initial treatment intensity. Several studies have provided evidence for CRA's effectiveness in achieving abstinence. Furthermore, CRA has been successfully integrated with a variety of other treatment approaches, such as family therapy and motivational interviewing, and has been tested in the treatment of other drug abuse. Community reinforcement and family training (CRAFT) is an adaptation of CRA that is aimed at giving the Concerned Significant Others (CSOs) of alcoholics skills to help them get the alcoholic into treatment.

== In other applications ==
In Chris E. Stout's book The Psychology of Terrorism: Theoretical Understandings and Perspective, Stout explains how community reinforcement is present in the psychotic state of terrorists. "The individual would feel less charged, validated, courageous, sanctified, and zealous, and would feel exposed as an individual." It is believed that the group mentality of a terrorist organization solidifies the mission of the group through communal reinforcement. Members are more likely to stay dedicated and follow through with the event of terror if they receive support from fellow terrorist members. An individual might abandon the mission in terror, but with the reinforcement of his peers, a member is more likely to stay involved.

== See also ==
- Argumentum ad populum, also known as Appeal to the population – Fallacy of claiming the majority is always correct
- Asch conformity experiments – Series of psychology studies
- Bandwagon effect – Societal phenomenon
- Indoctrination – Inculcating a person with certain ideas
- List of common misconceptions
- Collective consciousness – Shared beliefs and ideas in society
- Confirmation bias – Bias confirming existing attitudes
- Conformity – Matching opinions and behaviors to group norms
- Crowd manipulation – Application of crowd psychology
- Foot-in-the-door technique – Compliance tactic
- Groupthink – Psychological phenomenon that occurs within a group of people
- Group polarization – Tendency of a group to make more extreme decisions than the inclinations of its members
- Meme – Cultural idea which spreads through imitation
- Overton window – Range of ideas tolerated in public discourse
- Peer pressure – Influencing peers to conform
- Selective exposure theory – Theory within the practice of psychology
- Social constructionism – Sociological theory regarding shared understandings
- Social proof – Psychological phenomenon regarding conformity
- Spiral of silence – Political science and mass communication theory
- Truthiness – Quality of preferring concepts or facts one wishes to be true, rather than actual truth
