= Minority influence =

Form of social influence

Minority influence, a form of social influence, takes place when a member of a minority group influences the majority to accept the minority's beliefs or behavior. This occurs when a small group or an individual acts as an agent of social change by questioning established societal perceptions, and proposing alternative, original ideas which oppose the existing social norms. There are two types of social influence: majority influence (resulting in conformity and public compliance) and minority influence (resulting in conversion). Majority influence refers to the majority trying to produce conformity on the minority, while minority influence is converting the majority to adopt the thinking of the minority group. Unlike other forms of influence, minority influence is often thought of as a more innovative form of social change, because it usually involves a personal shift in private opinion. Examples of minority influence include the civil rights movement in the United States and the anti-apartheid movement in South Africa.

== History ==
Nearly all early research on minority influence focused on how the majority influenced the minority, based on the assumption of many psychologists that it would be very hard for the minority to have any influence on the majority. Serge Moscovici had a different perspective, as he believed that it was possible for a minority influence to overcome majority influence. As a result, he conducted his own study on minority influence in 1969. Similar to Asch's (1951) 'blue-green' experiment, to see if a group of four participants were influenced by a minority. His research was important as it was one of the first studies to show that a minority was able to change the opinions of the majority. The research of Moscovici and his colleagues opened the door to more research on the subject.

== Mechanism ==
Moscovici's (1980, 1985) conversion theory outlines a dual process of social influence. When an individual's views differ from the majority view, this causes inner turmoil, motivating the individual to reduce conflict by using a comparison process, leading to compliance and public acceptance of the majority position to avoid ostracism and potential ridicule. Therefore, majority influence is seen as normative social influence because often it is generated by a desire to fit in and conform to the group, e.g. Asch's (1951) line study. Conversely, a minority view is more distinctive, capturing attention and resulting in a validation process, where people carefully analyse the discrepancy between their own view and the minority view. This often results in attitude conversion, where the individual is convinced that the minority view is correct, which is much more likely to be private rather than public.

Majority influence occurs when people conform to certain beliefs and behaviours in order to be accepted by others. Unlike majority influence, minority influence can rarely influence others through normative social influence because the majority is indifferent to the minority's perspective of them. To influence the majority, the minority group would take the approach of informational social influence (Wood, 1994). By presenting information that the majority does not know or expect, this new or unexpected information catches the attention of the majority to carefully consider and examine the minority's view. After consideration, when the majority finds more validity and merit in the minority's view, the majority group has a higher chance of accepting part or all of the minority opinion.

Although the majority group may accept part or all of the minority view, that fact does not necessarily indicate that the majority has been completely influenced by the minority. A study by Elizabeth Mannix and Margaret Ann Neale (2005) shows that having the support from the majority leader could prove to be the critical factor in getting the minority opinion to be heard and be accepted. The support of a leader gives the majority more confidence in the merit of the minority opinion, leading to an overall respect for the minority. The strength of the "key people" (Van Avermaet, 1996) comes from the reputation built from their consistency of behaviors and ideas. Involving key people will benefit the minority view because people are more open to hear from others whom they trust and respect. In minority influence, a few influential leaders can influence the opposing majority to the minority's way of thinking. Even small changes in the influence of a minority ideology can trigger substantial changes in behavior or beliefs. In the end, having a more supportive and active minority group could lead to innovative and better decision-making.

== Affecting factors ==
=== Size of minority ===
Moscovici and Nemeth (1974) argue that a minority of one is more influential than a minority of more than one, as one person is more likely to be consistent over long periods of time and will not divide the majority's attention. They explain that a person may question themself: "How can they be so wrong and yet so sure of themselves?", resulting in a tendency to reevaluate the entire situation, considering all possible alternatives, including the minority view. On the other hand, two people are more likely to be influential than one person as they are less likely to be seen as strange or eccentric. More recent research has supported the latter due to the belief that a minority with two or more, if consistent, has more credibility and is therefore more likely to influence the majority.

=== Size of majority ===
The social impact model (Latané & Wolf 1981) predicts that as the size of the majority grows, the influence of the minority decreases, both in public and in private attitude change. The social impact model further explains that social impact is the multiplicative effect of strength (power, status, knowledge), the immediacy (physical proximity and recency), and the number of group members, supporting the view that a minority will be less influential on a larger majority.

Clark and Maass (1990) looked at the interaction between minority influence and majorities of varying sizes, and found that, like Latané & Wolf's findings, the minority's influence decreases in a negatively accelerating power function as the majority increases. This is reflected in findings that minority support should decrease considerably with the first few members of the majority, but additional members will have a marginally declining impact on getting people to conform to the majority position.

Similarly, Latané and Wolf cite Solomon Asch's work with "the magic number three". After his experiments, Asch concludes that when the majority consists of just one or two individuals, there is very little conformity. The addition of a third majority member dramatically increases conformity, but increases beyond three did not result in increasing amounts of conformity.

=== Behavioural style ===
Minority influence is more likely to occur if the point of view of the minority is consistent, flexible, and appealing to the majority. Having a consistent and unwavering opinion will increase the appeal to the majority, leading to a higher chance of adaption to the minority view. However, any wavering opinions from the minority group could lead the majority to dismiss the minority's claims and opinions. Serge Moscovici and Nemeth (1974) argued that minority influence is effective as long as there is consistency over time and agreement among the members of the minority. If this consistency were lost, then the minority would lose its credibility. This can be the case if a member of the minority deserts and joins the majority, as this damages the consistency and unity of the minority. After this occurrence, members of the majority are less likely to shift their position to that of the minority. The key to minority influence being successful is not just consistency, but how the majority interprets consistency. If the consistent minority are seen as too inflexible, rigid, and unwilling to change, they are unlikely to influence the majority. However, if they appear flexible and compromising, they will be seen as less extreme and more reasonable, having a better chance of changing majority views.

=== Dispositional and situational factors ===
Research shows that individuals are more likely to listen to the minority and take on their ideas if they identify with them as being similar to themselves. Maass & Clark (1984) arranged for a group of heterosexual participants to hear a debate on gay rights. The results showed that the majority heterosexual group debating was easier for the heterosexual participants to relate to. Therefore, the minority homosexual group had less of an influence. Influence is more likely to occur if the minority (or majority) is part of our 'in-group' as we are more likely to be influenced by those who are similar to us. This research contradicts with Moscovici's view that deviant minorities (or out-groups) are essential for minority influence to occur. In-group minorities are more likely to be successful, as they are seen as part of the group, and therefore their ideas are seen as more acceptable. On the other hand, out-groups are more likely to be discriminated, as they are not seen as part of the group, causing them to seem strange or unusual.

In addition, the decisions of others may affect the potency of minority influence. Asch (1952) conducted a study in which test subjects would be accompanied one of two "partners" during a series of questions posed to a group: a) a partner that would agree with the subject's minority view, or b) a partner that would be more extremely incorrect than the majority. Asch found that regardless of the role of the "partner", the fact that the consensus was broken – even if by just one individual ("the magic number one") – was enough to reduce conformity to a majority, and add credibility to the minority view.

== Application: juries ==
=== Stories, evidence and verdicts ===
Most juries will elect a leader and then decide whether the voting for a verdict will be public or private. Using the Story Model Theory which suggests that cognitive processing of trial information is what drives jurors to mentally organize evidence in coherent, credible narratives, jurors will approach a verdict in one of two ways. Verdict Driven jurors sort the evidence into categories of guilty and not guilty before deliberation. This type of juror feels the need to reach a verdict quickly, and may feel social pressure outside of the group to deliver the decision in a time-efficient manner. On the other hand, Evidence Based jurors will resist making a final decision on the verdict until they have reviewed all the evidence. Such jurors tend to explore their different options as a group and are less influenced by the social pressure outside of the group to reach a verdict quickly.

=== Minority influence in juries ===
The verdict favored by the majority on the first ballot becomes the jury's final decision in about 90% of all jury trials. Minorities, then, do have some influence over the outcome. When a jury is hung, it is usually because one or two jurors are holding out, or resisting the influence of the majority. If these jury members are consistent in their views, it is likely they will be able to convince another member of the jury to also side with their view. As time goes on, more and more jurors may change their vote in favor of the original minority. It is, however, extremely important the original jurors are consistent and confident in their opinions. The more unsteady they appear, the less likely they are to conquer the majority.

=== Status and influence in juries ===
Members of a jury who have high prestige or status are usually more influential than members who are not. Members who are also of high socioeconomic status are also more likely to influential in the jury deliberation process. This is demonstrated by the correlation between private preliberation opinion and jury's final decision was .50 for rich members and .2 for laborers. However, in recent analysis, race and sex no longer determine influence in juries.

=== Improving juries ===
1. Jury Size: modifying could influence group structure, representativeness, and majority influence; large juries are more likely to be hung, but small and large juries do not significantly differ in the types of verdicts reached.
2. Unanimity: juries that do not have to reach a unanimous decision render their judgements twice as quickly and are less likely to be hung.
3. Procedural Innovation: we can improve juries by making the instructions given to juries (prior to deliberation) clearer and more understandable. If the members understand at the beginning of the process what their requirements are, then they will be more efficient in their delivery of the verdict, and be more understanding of the process.

== Yielding ==
=== Social cryptoamnesia ===
After a number of members have shifted their opinion to agree with the minority group, that minority becomes a majority. This is known as the snowball effect. When a minority creates social change in society, the new view becomes an integral part of the society's culture. This results in the source of the minority influence that led to change being forgotten, which is known as social cryptoamnesia. Minority influence can be successful if people can dissociate between the socio-cognitive activities of resistance that are induced by the source and other activities of resistance that develop from the content of the message. The process of dissociation is explained by social cryptoamnesia: what was originally considered different is gradually constructed as an alternative (Perez, 1995).

A person can be affected by minority influence whether directly or indirectly. However, if one is not aware of the influence, the minority ideas could be taken as one's own while disregarding where the original idea came from. Social cryptoamnesia explains that thoughts and ideas that challenge or shock are stored in latent memory without retaining the ownership of the idea. Ideas that were supposedly forgotten have reappeared in the person's mind as his or her own belief or thought. This major attitude change takes place when the zeitgeist has changed. In history, minorities have changed the attitudes of society, and the attitudes of society have changed the personal opinion of the majority in that society. Although minority influence may not affect a person immediately, one's beliefs and behaviors may change over time due to social cryptoamnesia.

== Broadening views in organizations ==
By integrating the theory of minority influence in organizations, people may be more open to learning and change, benefiting the organization in the end.

=== Increasing diversity in the workplace ===
Not only is minority influence seen in social groups, but this type of social influence is also present in the workplace. Incorporating the concept of minority influence can encourage diversity and change in a corporate organization. Mannix and Neale (2005) performed a case study on a company that asked all the senior managers to mentor junior managers, preparing at least three younger managers to be ready and competent enough to replace the older managers. From this study, the firm realized that they were not achieving the extent of diversity that they intended. As a result, the company required at least one of the three junior managers in training to be a woman or underrepresented minority. This new requirement improved the intended diversity in the organization as well as the interaction between the senior manager mentor and the junior manager mentee.

=== Improving organizational values and culture ===
In another study by Mannix and Neale, yearly performance evaluations were completed for Hispanic, African American, and Asian managers. Their performance reviews evaluated the managers on less tangible measures related to leadership, an essential factor that is considered for receiving a promotion. Upon reflection of the company's performance evaluations, a senior leader suggested that the criteria on which managers were assessed was biased toward a "white, Anglo management style" (Mannix, 2005). As a solution, the leadership performance and promotion criteria of the performance reviews were revised. From this change and inclusion of minority influence, managers were able to learn from their strengths and weaknesses and change. Along with changing the criteria of performance evaluations, the organization itself underwent a change in values and culture.

== Combined with majority influence ==
There is evidence to suggest that it is possible for minority influence and majority influence to work together. A study by Clark (1994) uses a jury setting from the film 12 Angry Men to investigate social influence. Some of the participants were asked to just read the arguments from one of the characters (who acted as the minority), while the other group were also told how he changed the opinion of the rest of the jury. Social influence was present in both groups, but was stronger in the group that was exposed to both the arguments (minority influence) and the knowledge that the jury conformed (majority influence).

== See also ==
- Culture jamming
- Dominant minority
- Identity politics
- Minoritarianism
