= Conversion theory of minority influence =

Conversion theory is Serge Moscovici's conceptual analysis of the cognitive and interpersonal processes that mediate the direct and indirect impact of a consistent minority on the majority (Moscovici, 1976). Initially, Moscovici's conversion theory of minority influence began as a minority opinion that was rejected by many researchers, but eventually members of opposition validated it, thus confirming the theory's exact predictions. Solomon Asch's studies highlighted the power that majorities have over groups and their subsequent conformity, but Moscovici was more interested in the power exerted by minorities.

Contrasting the "majority rules" model of social influence, conversion theory maintains that disagreement within the group results in conflict, and that group members are motivated to reduce that conflict—either by changing their own opinions or attempting to get others to change. Minorities have a different process of influence, and Moscovici theorized that they do so by a validation process (majorities undergo comparison processes). If someone within the minority breaks that unanimity of the majority, this captures the majority's attention, causing them to consider their arguments and reasoning for disagreement (Moscovici, 1976). If the new information/opinions garnered from the minority are validated, this may sway the majority and lead to more long lasting changes than changes occurring via comparison processes. This is because validation leads to private acceptance, whereas comparison processes result in direct influence as members publicly comply. Generally, validation is a long process, so the effects of a minority are somewhat slower to emerge and identify.

One of the first tests of this theory was a reversal of Asch conformity experiments by adding two confederates in a six-person group, and arranging for them to systematically disagree with the majority decision. Instead of lines, the participants judged (aloud) the color and brightness of a series of 36 colored slides (all were blue with varying luminosity). The confederates were told to consistently state "green" rather than "blue." When tested alone, the error rate of participants was 0.25% (i.e., saying green when the answer was blue), but when tested in the presence of the green-saying confederates, the error rate increased to 8.4%, thus confirming the power of a minority (Forsyth, 2010).
