= S. Asch =

S. Asch may refer to:

- Sholem Asch (1880–1957), Polish-Jewish novelist
- Solomon Asch (1907–1996), Polish-American psychologist
