= Secret brand =

Type of business model without advertising services

A secret brand is any design or manufacturing company that does not advertise or overtly label its products. The marketing of these products can be designed to take advantage of the deliberate scarcity and rarity of the product, or to isolate an existing brand from potential risk to its image from association with a new or experimental product.

== Marketing strategy ==
The idea of a secret brand works off of one or more of three economic principles. The first is scarcity value. The secret brand creates products with highly specific, unique qualities, usually very subtle and invisible to the casual observer. These qualities do not necessarily improve the performance of the product and can be inefficiencies (e.g., using heavy-weight denim for casual clothes). The customer purchases the product for its rarity; to have something that is very difficult to acquire.

The second principle is branding. Large companies wanting to reach a new demographic may use a secret brand to establish clout among that demographic. This imprint brand may use the distribution network of the parent brand, but ship from a dummy company. Alternatively, the secret brand may employ individuals posing as independent agents to distribute goods to specialty stores. The theory behind these strategies is that it allows the parent company to expand its demographic without compromising the brand identity of its "open" brand.

The third principle is experimentation. Openly announcing new products often affects stock values in publicly traded companies. If a company is unsure of the real world appeal of a product, it may employ a secret brand to experiment with market reaction on a small scale. This technique may be used after inconclusive focus group results (i.e. the majority somewhat dislike the product, while the minority is highly enthusiastic about it).
