= Seminal =

Seminal, ultimately from Latin semen, "seed", may refer to:

- Relating to seeds
- Relating to semen
- A work, event or person having much social influence on later developments
