= Bandwagon effect =

Societal phenomenon

The bandwagon effect is a psychological phenomenon where people adopt certain behaviors, styles, or attitudes simply because others are doing so. More specifically, it is a cognitive bias by which public opinion or behaviours can alter due to particular actions and beliefs rallying amongst the public. It is a psychological phenomenon whereby the rate of uptake of beliefs, ideas, fads and trends increases with respect to the proportion of others who have already done so. As more people come to believe in something, others also "hop on the bandwagon", regardless of the underlying evidence.

Following others' actions or beliefs can occur because of conformism or deriving information from others. Much of the influence of the bandwagon effect comes from the desire to 'fit in' with peers; making similar selections as other people is seen as a way to gain access to a particular social group. An example of this is fashion trends wherein the increasing popularity of a certain garment or style encourages more acceptance. When individuals make rational choices based on the information they receive from others, economists have proposed that information cascades can quickly form in which people ignore their personal information signals and follow the behaviour of others. Cascades explain why behaviour is fragile as people understand that their behaviour is based on a very limited amount of information. As a result, fads form easily but are also easily dislodged. The phenomenon is observed in various fields, such as economics, political science, medicine, and psychology. In social psychology, people's tendency to align their beliefs and behaviors with a group is known as 'herd mentality' or 'groupthink'. The reverse bandwagon effect (also known as the snob effect in certain contexts) is a cognitive bias that causes people to avoid doing something, because they believe that other people are doing it.

== Origin ==
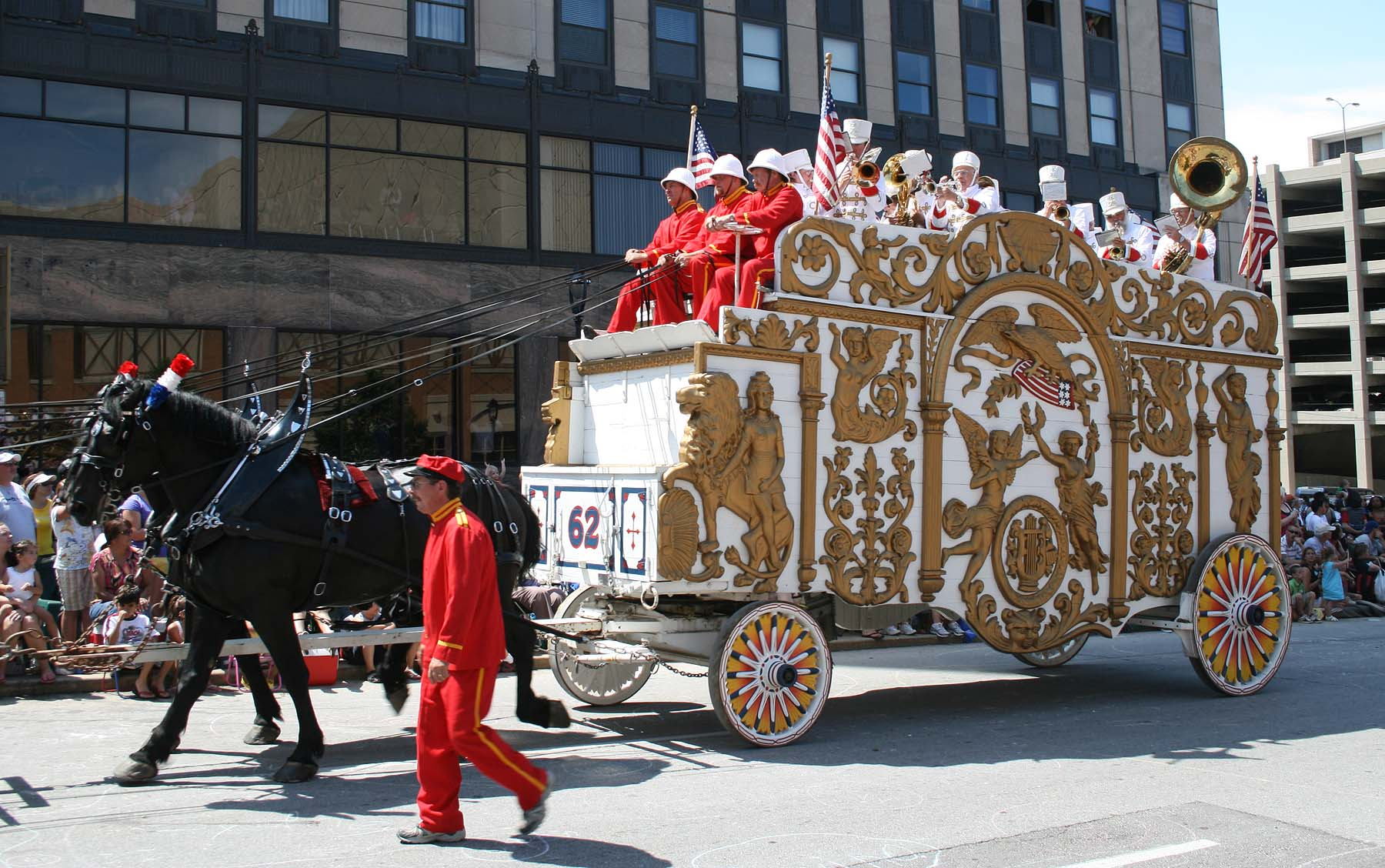
A literal "bandwagon", from which the metaphor is derived

The phenomenon where ideas become adopted as a result of their popularity has been apparent for some time. However, the metaphorical use of the term bandwagon in reference to this phenomenon began in 1848. A literal "bandwagon" is a wagon that carries a musical ensemble, or band, during a parade, circus, or other entertainment event.

The phrase "jump on the bandwagon" first appeared in American politics in 1848 during the presidential campaign of Zachary Taylor. Dan Rice, a famous and popular circus clown of the time, invited Taylor to join his circus bandwagon. As Taylor gained more recognition and his campaign became more successful, people began saying that Taylor's political opponents ought to "jump on the bandwagon" themselves if they wanted to be associated with such success.

Later, during the time of William Jennings Bryan's 1900 presidential campaign, bandwagons had become standard in campaigns, and the phrase "jump on the bandwagon" was used as a derogatory term, implying that people were associating themselves with success without considering with which they associated themselves.

Despite its emergence in the late 19th century, it was only recently that the theoretical background of bandwagon effects was understood. One of the best-known experiments on the topic is the 1950s' Asch conformity experiment, which illustrates the individual variation in the bandwagon effect. Academic study of the bandwagon effect especially gained interest in the 1980s, as scholars studied the effect of public opinion polls on voter opinions.

== Causes and factors ==
Individuals are highly influenced by the pressure and norms exerted by groups. As an idea or belief increases in popularity, people are more likely to adopt it; when seemingly everyone is doing something, there is an incredible pressure to conform. Individuals' impressions of public opinion or preference can originate from several sources.

Some individual reasons behind the bandwagon effect include:

- Efficiency — Bandwagoning serves as a mental shortcut, or heuristic, allowing for decisions to be made quickly. It takes time for an individual to evaluate a behaviour or thought and decide upon it.
- Normative social influence (belonging) — People tend to conform with others out of a desire to fit in with the crowd and gain approval from others. As conformity ensures some level of social inclusion and acceptance, many people go along with the behaviours and/or ideas of their group to avoid being the odd one out. The 'spiral of silence' exemplifies this factor.
- Informational social influence — People tend to conform with others out of a desire to be right, under the assumption that others may know something or may understand the situation better. In other words, people will support popular beliefs because they are seen as correct by the larger social group (the 'majority'). Moreover, when it seems as though the majority is doing a certain thing, not doing that thing becomes increasingly difficult. When individuals make rational choices based on the information they receive from others, economists have proposed that information cascades can quickly form in which people decide to ignore their personal information signals and follow the behaviour of others.
- Fear of missing out — People who are anxious about 'missing out' on things that others are doing may be susceptible to the bandwagon effect.
- Being on the 'winning side' — The desire to support a "winner" (or avoid supporting a "loser") can be what makes some susceptible to the bandwagon effect, such as in the case of voting for a candidate because they're in the lead.

Another cause can come from distorted perceptions of mass opinion, known as 'false consensus' or 'pluralistic ignorance'. In politics, bandwagon effects can also come as a result of indirect processes that are mediated by political actors. Perceptions of popular support may affect the choice of activists about which parties or candidates to support with donations or voluntary work in campaigns.

=== Spread ===
The bandwagon effect works through a self-reinforcing mechanism, and can spread quickly and on a large scale through a positive feedback loop, whereby the more who are affected by it, the more likely other people are to be affected by it too.

A new concept that is originally promoted by only a single advocate or a minimal group of advocates can quickly grow and become widely popular, even when sufficient supporting evidence is lacking. What happens is that a new concept gains a small following, which grows until it reaches a critical mass, until for example it begins being covered by mainstream media, at which point a large-scale bandwagon effect begins, which causes more people to support this concept, in increasingly large numbers. This can be seen as a result of the availability cascade, a self-reinforcing process through which a certain belief gains increasing prominence in public discourse.

== Real-world examples ==
=== In politics ===
The bandwagon effect can take place in voting: it occurs on an individual scale where a voters opinion on vote preference can be altered due to the rising popularity of a candidate or a policy position. The aim for the preference change is for the voter to end up picking the "winner's side" in the end. Voters are more so persuaded to do so in elections that are non-private or when the vote is highly publicised.

The bandwagon effect has been applied to situations involving majority opinion, such as political outcomes, where people alter their opinions to the majority view. Such a shift in opinion can occur because individuals draw inferences from the decisions of others, as in an informational cascade.

Perceptions of popular support may affect the choice of activists about which parties or candidates to support with donations or voluntary work in campaigns. They may strategically funnel these resources to contenders perceived as well supported and thus electorally viable, thereby enabling them to run more powerful and thus more influential campaigns.

=== In economics ===
American economist Gary Becker has argued that the bandwagon effect is powerful enough to flip the demand curve to be upward sloping. A typical demand curve is downward sloping—as prices rise, demand falls. However, according to Becker, an upward slope would imply that even as prices rise, the demand rises.

==== Financial markets ====
The bandwagon effect comes about in two ways in financial markets.

First, through price bubbles: these bubbles often happen in financial markets in which the price for a particularly popular security keeps on rising. This occurs when many investors line up to buy a security bidding up the price, which in turn attracts more investors. The price can rise beyond a certain point, causing the security to be highly overvalued.

Second is liquidity holes: when unexpected news or events occur, market participants will typically stop trading activity until the situation becomes clear. This reduces the number of buyers and sellers in the market, causing liquidity to decrease significantly. The lack of liquidity leaves price discovery distorted and causes massive shifts in asset prices, which can lead to increased panic, which further increases uncertainty, and the cycle continues.

==== Microeconomics ====
In microeconomics, bandwagon effects may play out in interactions of demand and preference. The bandwagon effect arises when people's preference for a commodity increases as the number of people buying it increases. Consumers may choose their product based on others' preferences believing that it is the superior product. This selection choice can be a result of directly observing the purchase choice of others or by observing the scarcity of a product compared to its competition as a result of the choices previous consumers have made. This scenario can also be seen in restaurants where the number of customers in a restaurant can persuade potential diners to eat there based on the perception that the food must be better than the competition due to its popularity. This interaction potentially disturbs the normal results of the theory of supply and demand, which assumes that consumers make buying decisions exclusively based on price and their own personal preference.

=== In medicine ===
Decisions made by medical professionals can also be influenced by the bandwagon effect. Particularly, the widespread use and support of now-disproven medical procedures throughout history can be attributed to their popularity at the time. Layton F. Rikkers (2002), professor emeritus of surgery at the University of Wisconsin–Madison, calls these prevailing practices medical bandwagons, which he defines as "the overwhelming acceptance of unproved but popular [medical] ideas."

Medical bandwagons have led to inappropriate therapies for numerous patients, and have impeded the development of more appropriate treatment.

One paper from 1979 on the topic of bandwagons of medicine describes how a new medical concept or treatment can gain momentum and become mainstream, as a result of a large-scale bandwagon effect:

- The news media finds out about a new treatment and publicizes it, often by publishing pieces.
- Various organizations, such as government agencies, research foundations, and private companies also promote the new treatment, typically because they have some vested interest in seeing it succeed.
- The public picks up on the now-publicized treatment and pressures medical practitioners to adopt it, especially when that treatment is perceived as being novel.
- Doctors often want to accept the new treatment, because it offers a compelling solution to a difficult issue.
- Since doctors have to consume large amounts of medical information to stay aware of the latest trends in their field, it is sometimes difficult for them to read new material in a sufficiently critical manner.

=== In sports ===
One who supports a particular sports team, despite having shown no interest in that team until it started gaining success, can be considered a "bandwagon fan".

=== In social networking ===
As an increasing number of people begin to use a specific social networking site or application, people are more likely to begin using those sites or applications. The bandwagon effect also affects random people in terms of which posts are viewed and shared.

This research used bandwagon effects to examine the comparative impact of two separate bandwagon heuristic indicators (quantitative vs. qualitative) on changes in news readers' attitudes in an online comments section. Furthermore, Study 1 demonstrated that qualitative signals had a stronger influence on news readers' judgments than quantitative clues. Additionally, Study 2 confirmed the results of Study 1 and showed that people's attitudes are influenced by apparent public opinion, offering concrete proof of the influence of digital bandwagons.

=== In fashion ===
The bandwagon effect can also affect the way the masses dress and can be responsible for clothing trends. People tend to want to dress in a manner that suits the current trend and will be influenced by those whom they see often, normally celebrities. Such publicised figures will normally act as the catalyst for the style of the current period. Once a small group of consumers attempts to emulate a particular celebrity's dress choice more people tend to copy the style due to the pressure or want to fit in and be liked by their peers.

== See also ==
- Bandwagoning
- Basking in reflected glory
- Brainwashing
- Communal reinforcement
- Crowd psychology
- Groupthink
- Herd behavior
- List of cognitive biases
- Snowball effect
- Social comparison theory
- Positive feedback
- Dogpiling (Internet)
- Tall poppy syndrome
- Confirmation bias
- Anchoring effect
- Hindsight bias

== Bibliography ==
- Goidel, Robert K.; Shields, Todd G. (1994). "The Vanishing Marginals, the Bandwagon, and the Mass Media". The Journal of Politics. 56 (3): 802–810. doi:10.2307/2132194. JSTOR 2132194. S2CID 153664631.
- McAllister, Ian; Studlar, Donley T. (1991). "Bandwagon, Underdog, or Projection? Opinion Polls and Electoral Choice in Britain, 1979-1987". The Journal of Politics. 53 (3): 720–740. doi:10.2307/2131577. JSTOR 2131577. S2CID 154257577.
- Mehrabian, Albert (1998). "Effects of Poll Reports on Voter Preferences". Journal of Applied Social Psychology. 28 (23): 2119–2130. doi:10.1111/j.1559-1816.1998.tb01363.x.
- Morwitz, Vicki G.; Pluzinski, Carol (1996). "Do Polls Reflect Opinions or Do Opinions Reflect Polls?". Journal of Consumer Research. 23 (1): 53–65. doi:10.1086/209466. JSTOR 2489665.
