= Argumentum ad populum =

Fallacy of claiming the majority is always correct

In argumentation theory, an argumentum ad populum (Latin for 'appeal to the people') is an informal fallacy that asserts a claim is true, good, or correct because many people allegedly think so.

== Alternative names ==
Other names for the fallacy include:

- appeal to (common) belief
- appeal to popularity
- appeal to the majority
- appeal to the masses
- argument from consensus
- authority of the many
- bandwagon fallacy
- common belief fallacy
- democratic fallacy
- mob appeal
- truth by association
- consensus gentium (Latin for 'agreement of the people')

== Description ==
Argumentum ad populum is a type of informal fallacy, specifically a fallacy of relevance, and is similar to an argument from authority (argumentum ad verecundiam). It uses an appeal to the beliefs, tastes, or values of a group of people, stating that because a certain opinion or attitude is held by a majority, or even everyone, it is therefore correct.

Appeals to popularity are common in commercial advertising that portrays products as desirable because they are used by many people or associated with popular sentiments instead of communicating the merits of the products themselves.

The inverse argument, that something that is unpopular must be flawed, is also a form of this fallacy.

The fallacy is similar in structure to certain other fallacies that involve a confusion between the "justification" of a belief and its "widespread acceptance" by a given group of people. When an argument uses the appeal to the beliefs of a group of experts, it takes on the form of an appeal to authority; if the appeal relates to the beliefs of a group of respected elders or the members of one's community over a long time, then it takes on the form of an appeal to tradition.

=== Scholarship ===
The philosopher Irving Copi defined argumentum ad populum differently from an appeal to popular opinion itself, as an attempt to rouse the "emotions and enthusiasms of the multitude".

Douglas N. Walton argues that appeals to popular opinion can be logically valid in some cases, such as in political dialogue within a democracy.

== Reversals ==
In some circumstances, a person may argue that the fact that Y people believe X to be true implies that X is false. This line of thought is closely related to the appeal to spite fallacy given that it invokes a person's contempt for the general populace or something about the general populace to persuade them that most are wrong about X. This ad populum reversal commits the same logical flaw as the original fallacy given that the idea "X is true" is inherently separate from the idea that "Y people believe X": "Y people believe in X as true, purely because Y people believe in it, and not because of any further considerations. Therefore X must be false." While Y people can believe X to be true for fallacious reasons, X might still be true. Their motivations for believing X do not affect whether X is true or false.

Y = most people, a given quantity of people, people of a particular demographic.

X = a statement that can be true or false.

Examples:

- "Are you going to be a mindless conformist drone drinking milk and water like everyone else, or will you wake up and drink my product?"
- "Everyone likes The Beatles and that probably means that they didn't have nearly as much talent as <Y band>, which didn't sell out." (Note: These ideas are paraphrased from this presentation by authors Andrew Potter and Joseph Heath in which they state: "For example, everybody would love to listen to fabulous underground bands that nobody has ever heard of before, but not all of us can do this. Once too many people find out about this great band, then they are no longer underground. And so we say that it's sold out or 'mainstream' or even 'co-opted by the system'. What has really happened is simply that too many people have started buying their albums so that listening to them no longer serves as a source of distinction. The real rebels therefore have to go off and find some new band to listen to that nobody else knows about in order to preserve this distinction and their sense of superiority over others.")
- "The German people today consists of the Auschwitz generation, with every person in power being guilty in some way. How on earth can we buy the generally held propaganda that the Soviet Union is imperialistic and totalitarian? Clearly, it must not be." (Note: These ideas are paraphrased from the 'Baader Meinhof Gang' article at the True Crime Library, which states: "Gudrun Ensslin may have been wrong about many or most things, she was not speaking foolishly when she spoke of the middle-aged folk of her era as "the Auschwitz generation". Not all of them had been Nazis, of course, but a great many had supported Hitler. Many had been in the Hitler Youth and served in the armed forces, fighting Nazi wars of conquest. A minority had ineffectively resisted Nazism but, as a whole, it was a generation coping with an extraordinary burden of guilt and shame ... many of the people who joined what would come to be known as the Baader-Meinhof Gang were motivated by an unconscious desire to prove to themselves that they would have risked their lives to defeat Nazism ... West Germans well knew. Many of them had relatives in East Germany and were well aware that life under communism was regimented and puritanical at best and often monstrously oppressive.")
- "Everyone loves <A actor>. <A actor> must be nowhere near as talented as the devoted and serious method actors that aren't so popular like <B actor>."

In general, the reversal usually goes: "Most people believe A and B are both true. B is false. Thus, A is false." The similar fallacy of chronological snobbery is not to be confused with the ad populum reversal. Chronological snobbery is the claim that if belief in both X and Y was popularly held in the past and if Y was recently proved to be untrue then X must also be untrue. That line of argument is based on a belief in historical progress and not—like the ad populum reversal is—on whether or not X and/or Y is currently popular.

== Valid uses ==
Appeals to public opinion are valid in situations where consensus is the determining factor for the validity of a statement, such as linguistic usage and definitions of words.

=== Language ===
Linguistic descriptivists argue that correct grammar, spelling, and expressions are defined by the language's speakers, especially in languages which do not have a central governing body. According to this viewpoint, if an incorrect expression is commonly used, it becomes correct. In contrast, linguistic prescriptivists believe that incorrect expressions are incorrect regardless of how many people use them.

=== Mathematics ===
Special functions are mathematical functions that have well-established names and mathematical notations due to their significance in mathematics and other scientific fields.

There is no formal definition of what makes a function a special function; instead, the term special function is defined by consensus. Functions generally considered to be special functions include logarithms, trigonometric functions, and the Bessel functions.

== See also ==
- 50,000,000 Elvis Fans Can't Be Wrong
- A Hundred Authors Against Einstein
- Ad hominem
- Reductio ad Hitlerum
- Appeal to novelty
- Cognitive dissonance
- Consensus theory of truth
- Criticism of democracy
- Democracy
- Fundamental attribution bias
- Groupthink
- Hurting the feelings of the Chinese people
- Kayfabe
- List of fallacies
- Median voter theorem
- Scientific consensus
- Social proof
- Wisdom of the crowd
