= Snob effect =

Phenomenon in microeconomics

The snob effect is a phenomenon described in microeconomics as a situation where the demand for a certain good by individuals of a higher income level is inversely related to its demand by those of a lower income level. The "snob effect" contrasts most other microeconomic models, in that the demand curve can have a positive slope, rather than the typical negatively sloped demand curve of normal goods.

This situation is derived by the desire to own unusual, expensive or unique goods. These goods usually have a high economic value, but low practical value. The less of an item available, the higher its snob value. Examples of such items with general snob value are rare works of art, designer clothing, and sports cars.

In all these cases, one can debate whether they meet the snob value criterion, which in itself may vary from person to person. A person may reasonably claim to purchase a designer garment because of a certain threading technique, longevity, and fabric. While this is true in some cases, the desired effect can often be achieved by purchasing a less-expensive version from a reputable brand. Often these high-end items end up as closeout items in discount stores or online retailers where they may be offered at deep discounts from original price, bringing into question the true value of the product. Ultimately, wealthy consumers can be lured by superficial factors such as rarity, celebrity representation and brand prestige.

Collectors within a specific field can suffer from snob effect, searching for the rarest and often most expensive collectibles. Such examples are classic automobiles, stamps and coins.

== See also ==
- Snob
- Scarcity value
- Veblen good
- Bandwagon effect
