= Anticonformity (psychology) =

Behaviour challenging group norms

Anticonformity (counterconformity) is when an individual consciously and deliberately challenges the position or actions of the group. Anticonformity is not merely the absence of conformity. Anticonformity can be a response to certain context and social pressure or expectations. Anticonformity commonly takes place in a group environment where other individuals might differ in opinion. Individuals who display anticonformity behaviours are internally motivated to disrupt the balance of the group. Further, anticonformist individuals are motivated by rebelliousness and are not influenced by social forces or norms. Anticonformity has been labelled a dependent behaviour as its manifestation is dependent on the group's position in regard to an event or situation.

== History ==
The psychologist Michael Argyle conducted the first study of the concept of anticonformity. In his 1957 study, Argyle recruited male students and placed them in two-person groups (with one member being a confederate), then asked the pairs to judge and rate a painting on a 6-point Likert scale. In one of the conditions, Argyle instructed the confederate to reject the rating made by the participant. Following this rejection, the participant was required to make a second rating of the painting. Argyle used the difference between the two ratings to measure social influence. Argyle's results showed that nearly 8% of the participants expressed a higher disagreement with their partner on their second rating. Argyle classified these direct and deliberate disagreements as anticonformity behaviours.

Social psychologists Richard Willis and Richard Crutchfield proposed an alternate way of measuring and studying anticonformity. Instead of viewing conformity, independence, and anticonformity as degrees on a single continuum, the authors posited that these three dimensions represent vertices of a triangle, which allows for the simultaneous measurement of these dimensions. Social psychologists conclude that there are conditions that lead to a sense of conformity and when they are no longer present, anticonformity takes place. The two terms conformity/nonconformity are connected to one another by the conditions that conform an individual. Every set of individuals contain certain conditions that lead to feeling conformed and when they are not met, it may lead to anticonformity.

== Theories ==
Levine and Hogg identified a number of theories to account for the motivations underlying anticonformity behaviours, including:

- Psychological reactance
- Promoting change and innovation
- Establishing individuality
- Groupthink
- Avoiding sycophancy

The Double Diamond Model proposed by Paul R. Nail, Stefano I. Di Domenico, and Geoff MacDonald is a unified continuous response model that addresses anticonformity. The unified model incorporates two types of conformity and three types of anticonformity. Many social psychologists such as Argyle, Crutchfield, Willis, and Levine have discussed the two types of conformity: conversion and compliance. Conversion comformity is the positive influence of the individual to agree both publicly and privately to a change in opinion by another individual. Compliance conformity is the agreement occurring after a public agreement but remaining in disagreement privately. Anticonformity is the continuous need for behavioral and cognitive independence. An anticonformist is both publicly and privately in disagreement with others in the environment. The double diamond model of social responses introduces a new strategy in regards to anticonformity, strategic self-anticonformity. In other words, researchers claim that using reverse psychology could challenge anticonformist behavior.

== Across cultures ==
In 1973, Meade and Barnard conducted a study examining anticonformity behaviours in a sample of 60 American and 60 Chinese college students. Their results showed that there was a greater tendency for anticonformity behaviour among the American students compared to the Chinese students. These results may be explained by the type of culture in each country, where America has an individualistic culture compared to the collectivist culture of China.

== See also ==
- Anti-authoritarianism
- Freedom of speech
- Individualism
- Right to personal identity
