= Solomon Asch =

Polish-American psychologist (1907–1996)

- Born: September 14, 1907; Warsaw, Congress Poland, Russian Empire
- Died: February 20, 1996 (aged 88); Haverford, Pennsylvania, U.S.
- Education: City College of New York; Columbia University
- Known for: Social psychology (Social influence, conformity), Asch conformity experiments
- Scientific career
- Fields: Psychology (Gestalt, social, cognitive)
- Workplaces: College of the City of New York; Columbia University; Swarthmore College; Harvard University
- Academic advisors: Max Wertheimer
- Notable students: Stanley Milgram

Solomon Eliot Asch (September 14, 1907 – February 20, 1996) was a Polish-born American psychologist and pioneer in social psychology. Asch conducted seminal research on impression formation, prestige suggestion, and many other issues. He is most well known for his conformity experiments, in which he demonstrated the influence of group pressure on opinions.

As a proponent of Gestalt psychology, Asch's work reflects a common theme of that school of thought: that the whole is not only different from the sum of its parts, but the nature of the whole fundamentally alters our understanding of the parts. As he wrote in his book Social Psychology: "Most social acts have to be understood in their setting, and lose meaning if isolated. No error in thinking about social facts is more serious than the failure to see their place and function".

A Review of General Psychology survey, published in 2002, ranked Asch as the 41st most cited psychologist of the 20th century.

== Early life and education ==
Asch was born in Warsaw, Poland, on September 14, 1907, to a Polish-Jewish family. He grew up in a small town of Łowicz in central Poland. In 1920, at age 13, Asch emigrated with his family to the United States. They lived on the Lower East Side of Manhattan, a dense neighborhood populated with Jewish, Italian and Irish immigrants. His friends called him Shlaym.

Having been a shy child who was brought up in Poland, Asch initially did not speak English fluently. He attended sixth grade at his neighborhood's public school, P.S. 147. Because of the language barrier, Asch had difficulty understanding his teacher. He, however, learned English by reading Charles Dickens. Asch later attended Townsend Harris High School, a very selective high school attached to the City College of New York. After high school, he attended City College majoring in both literature and science. He became interested in psychology towards the end of his undergraduate career after reading the work of William James and a number of other philosophers. In 1928, when he was 21 years old, he received his Bachelor of Science.

Asch went on to pursue a doctoral degree at Columbia University. He initially was interested in anthropology, not social psychology. With the help of Gardner Murphy, Lois Murphy, Franz Boas, and Ruth Benedict he obtained a summer fellowship and investigated how children become socialized into the surrounding cultural milieu. Under the supervision of Robert S. Woodworth, Asch's master's thesis involved a statistical analysis of the test scores of 200 children. He received his master's degree in 1930. For his doctoral dissertation, Asch examined commonalities of the form of learning curves; H. E. Garrett assigned the topic to him. He received his Ph.D. in 1932.

Asch was exposed to Gestalt psychology through Gardner Murphy, then a young faculty member at Columbia. He became much more interested in Gestalt psychology after meeting and working closely with his adviser at Columbia, Max Wertheimer, one of the founders of Gestalt psychology. Later, Asch and Wertheimer became close friends.

== Career ==
Asch began his teaching career at Brooklyn College in 1932, after he earned his Ph.D. He left Brooklyn College for the New School for Social Research in 1943, where he replaced his mentor Max Wertheimer, who had recently died. In 1947, he moved to Swarthmore College, where he stayed until 1966. At the time Asch was there, Swarthmore was the major center of research that was oriented toward Gestalt psychology. During his time at Swarthmore, figures in Gestalt psychology such as Wolfgang Kohler, W. C. H. Prentice, and Hans Wallach were faculty members. While at Swarthmore, Asch served for two years (1958–1960) as a member of the Institute for Advanced Study in Princeton, New Jersey. At the Institute, Stanley Milgram, who later became a prominent social psychologist, worked as Asch's research assistant.

Dorothy Dinnerstein recruited Asch to leave Swarthmore for Rutgers University and become, in 1967, the first director of Rutgers's Institute for Cognitive Studies. In 1972, he moved to the University of Pennsylvania, teaching as a professor of psychology until he retired in 1979, and was a Professor Emeritus. Asch also had visiting posts at Harvard and MIT.

== Work ==
=== Impression formation ===
Asch was interested in how humans form impressions of other human beings. He was intrigued how humans are able to easily form impressions of others despite complex structures. He specifically was interested in how impressions of other people were established and if there were any principles which regulated these impressions. Asch concluded "to know a person is to have a grasp of a particular structure". He demonstrated through his experiments that forming an impression has the following elements:

1. it is an organized process,
2. the characteristics are perceived differently in relation to other characteristics,
3. central qualities are discovered, causing a distinction between them and peripheral qualities,
4. relations of harmony and contradiction are observed.

Asch conducted many experiments in which he asked participants to form an impression of a hypothetical person based on several characteristics said to belong to them.

==== Central characteristics on impression formation ====
In one experiment, two groups, A and B, were exposed to a list of exactly the same characteristics except one, cold vs. warm. The list of characteristics given to each group are listed below:

Group A: intelligent-skillful-industrious-warm-determined-practical-cautious

Group B: intelligent-skillful-industrious-cold-determined-practical-cautious

One group of people were told that the person was warm and another group of people were told the person is "cold". Participants were asked to write a brief description of the impression they formed after hearing these characteristics. The experimenters also produced a check list consisting of pairs of opposite traits, such as generous/ungenerous, shrewd/wise, etc. These words were related to the first list of characteristics they heard. Participants were asked to indicate which of these traits matched with the hypothetical person who had just been described to them.

Asch found that very different impressions were found based on this one characteristic in the list. In general, the "A" impressions were far more positive than the "B" impressions. Based on the results of the written descriptions of the hypothetical person, the meaning of the other characteristics in the list seemed to change, related to whether the hypothetical person was described as a "warm" or "cold" person.

Not all qualities were changed by this word. Words such as "honest", "strong", "serious", and "reliable" were not affected. The words "warm" and "cold" were shown to be of more importance in forming participant's impressions than other characteristics. They were considered to be basic to understanding the person, whereas other characteristics would be considered secondary. Thus, if another characteristic in this list was changed between two subjects, such as manipulating the words "polite" and "blunt", instead of the words "warm" and "cold", it would not affect the impression of the person as much as did "warm" and "cold". Asch called "warm" and "cold" "central" characteristics, and "polite" and "blunt" peripheral characteristics.

==== Order effects on impression formation ====
Asch found in another experiment, that the order in which he presented the traits of a hypothetical person drastically influenced the impression formed by participants formed. For example, participants were read one of the following lists below:

A. intelligent-industrious-impulsive-critical-stubborn-envious,
B. envious-stubborn-critical-impulsive-industrious-intelligent.

Series A starts with desirable qualities and ends with undesirable qualities, while the reverse is true for Series B. As a result of this slight difference, people perceive person A as someone who is an "able person who possesses certain shortcomings which, do not, however, overshadow his merits". But, people perceive person B as a "problem, whose abilities are hampered by his serious difficulties". The meaning of the other words in this list also change in the majority of subjects between list A and list B. Words such as "impulsive" and "critical" take on a positive meaning with A, but a negative meaning with B.

==== Similarity and difference of impression ====
In another central experiment, Asch presented participants with four groups of characteristics. Each participant was exposed to the group of words listed below:

Set 1: Quick, Skillful, Helpful.
Set 2: Quick, Clumsy, Helpful.
Set 3: Slow, Skillful, Helpful.
Set 4: Slow, Clumsy, Helpful.

Notice that only one characteristic, "helpful", is the same throughout all of the four sets. Participants were first asked which of the other three sets most resemble Set 1, and then asked which of the other sets most resembles Set 2. In 87 percent of the cases, Set 1 was seen most similar with Set 3. In only 13 percent of the cases, people reported Set 1 to be similar to Set 2. Also, Set 2 was said to resemble Set 4 in 85 percent of the cases and only 9 percent of the cases was it said to resemble Set I was the closest.

However, there are more "identical elements" in Set 1 and 2 and in Set 3 and 4. Notice that two of the three words are the same in Set 1 and 2 and in Set 3 and 4. The similarity in sets can not be based on the number of shared elements in the set. Participants also reported that the word "quick" of set 1 was most similar in meaning to "slow" of set 3. Similarly, "quick" of set 2 was perceived to be most similar in meaning to "slow" of set 4.

Asch reached the following conclusions based on this experiment:

1. The meaning of a characteristic changes based on a change in the "environment" it's in. Thus, the meanings of the words "quick" and "slow" change based on what other words it is presented with or associated with in real life. The meaning of the word "quick" in set 1 is associated more with "one of assurance, of smoothness of movement" while in set 2 the word is associated with "forced quickness, in an effort to be helpful". In everyday life, people perceive a quick, skillful person to be very different from a quick, clumsy person. However, people perceive someone who is "quick and skillful" and "slow and skillful" as being similar and sharing the same quality of being more of an expert.
2. The change in the meaning of the characteristic is determined by its relationship with other characteristics. "[Set] I is quick because he is skillful; [Set] 2 is clumsy because he is fast"

"In [Set] 3 slowness indicates care, prides in work well-done. Slowness in [Set] 4 indicates sluggishness, poor motor coordinate, some physical retardation". People arrive at an overall impression by integrating the relationships of the different qualities of a person. Therefore, they form very different impressions when one of these qualities differ.

1. "Dynamic consequences are grasped in the interaction of qualities", (Asch, p. 280). Participants considered "quick" and "skillful" and "slow" and "skillful" as characteristics that cooperate together, but they think of "quick" and "clumsy" as characteristics that cancel one another.

=== Prestige suggestion ===
As a result of World War II in the 1940s, Asch and other social psychologists were interested in propaganda. They wondered: How do you get people to believe what you want them to believe? How do you get people to believe they should sacrifice for the war effort?

In everyday life, psychologists noticed that people are persuaded by messages differently based on the identity of the author. It seemed that the more prestige the author/speaker has, the more likely the person will believe them. Many social psychologists prior to Asch had studied this phenomenon. However, Asch disagreed with many of them and critiqued their interpretations. His main conclusion was that a change in evaluation requires a change in the content and meaning of the response as a result of the change in context. Therefore, the meaning of the message is interpreted differently depending on who is the author of the message. He suggests that participants are not blindly accepting a message based on the author, but rather they are making meaning of the quote based on the author.

Asch called into question the present theory for the underlying psychological process concerning the effect of group forces on the formation and change of opinions and attitudes. He critiqued the experimental approach of many different psychologists, including Zillig, Moore, Marple, Sherif, Thorndike, and Lorge, in their investigations of evaluation change. Lorge's and Sherif's investigation of the effects of "prestige" on the evaluation of statements were investigated in detail in one of Asch's articles. all of the above-mentioned psychologists used the same basic procedure: A participant makes a judgment about some particular issue. At a later time, they judge the same problem again, but with information of how certain groups or prestigious people have evaluated the same problem. If the subject changes his judgment in the same direction as the evaluations of these groups of people or prestigious people, then it is considered a degree of influence that they have exerted on the participant's judgment.

==== Lorge critique ====
Irving Lorge's main finding had been that "prestige" can alter evaluations of statements of serious political and economic questions.

In his experiment, subjects rated a set of 50 quotations on a 5-point scale of "agreement" or "disagreement" with the statement. The quotes were followed by the names of two public people. Subjects were informed that one of the names was the author of the true source and were asked to select the true author. After about a month, the subjects again rated the same quotation but with the true author only listed below the quotation. Subjects also rated earlier their "respect for the political opinions of each of these individuals". This was used as a measure of prestige. Lorge found that participants rated the same statement differently when it was referred to a different author with the rating tending to rise when it was referred to a more "prestigious" author.

One of Lorge's main conclusions was that "an unchanged object of judgment undergoes a change of evaluation". Therefore, the prestige of the author was viewed as acting arbitrarily on the statement regardless of the content or merit of the statement. Participants simply viewed the statement as having higher value when the author has higher prestige.

Asch reinterpreted Lorge's findings and suggested that there was "a change in the object of judgment, rather than in the judgment of the object" (Asch, 1940). He suggested that a person will redefine the object of judgment based on the content of the evaluations. Therefore, the person will base the meaning of the quote in the context of what he/she believes to be true about the person who said the quote, resulting in different meanings of the statements based on the author.

In evidence of his claims, Asch conducted an experiment in which college students read statements with the name of one author below each statement. They were instructed to describe what the statement meant to them. Two groups of students read the same statements but with different authors associated with them. The main finding was that there was a "cognitive reorganization" of the statement based on what was understood about the author of the statement. Participant's felt the meaning of the quote differed depending on who wrote the statement.

For example, the following quote was presented to both groups of subjects: "Only the willfully blind can fail to see that the old style capitalism of a primitive freebooting period is gone forever. The capitalism of complete laissez-faire, which thrived on low wages and maximum profits for minimum turnover, which rejected collective bargaining and fought against justified public regulation of the competitive process, is a thing of the past." When participants thought that Bridges (a well-known union leader) was the author, they interpreted the passage to be an "expression of the accomplishments of labor in the face of opposition from capital and contained a resolve to defend these gains from attack". However, when Johnston (president of the U.S. Chamber of Commerce at the time) was the author, they interpreted the passage to be "a perspective of policy in the interest of business, especially of 'enlightened' business". Asch conducted a very similar and classic study with participants reading statements either attributed to Jefferson or Lenin.

One of Asch's major points is that participants are not completely blind in the experiment and make arbitrary choices based on this bias. Asch claims that participants were acting reasonable in their change of evaluation of the judgment, because the context of the judgment and thus the meaning of the judgment had changed. Lorge, however, suggested that if the participants were behaving logical, their evaluations should have remained the same despite the change in author.

==== Sherif critique ====
Muzafer Sherif conducted an experiment, very similar to Lorge, in which he investigated how prestige affects the evaluation of literary materials. College students were asked to rank a set of prose passages according to their literary quality. Each passage also included the name of a well-known author. However, all of the passages were actually written by the same author. Participants rated the authors earlier in terms of their literary standing. Sherif found that passages which were identified with highly acclaimed authors received higher rankings.

Asch suggested that Sherif's results could be largely influenced from the environment of a laboratory experiment. Because the experiment was designed to have each of the passages have very few differences between them, participants were faced with a dilemma when asked to distinguish between them. The experimenter and other neighboring participants may appear to find the task obvious, so the participant attends to any clues that might help him make the decision. In fear of looking ridiculous, the participant might now approach the task as, "Which of these am I expected to like and dislike?" With the only information that varies being the author, the participant might make conclusions about the quotes based on this one piece of information that varies.

=== Conformity experiments ===
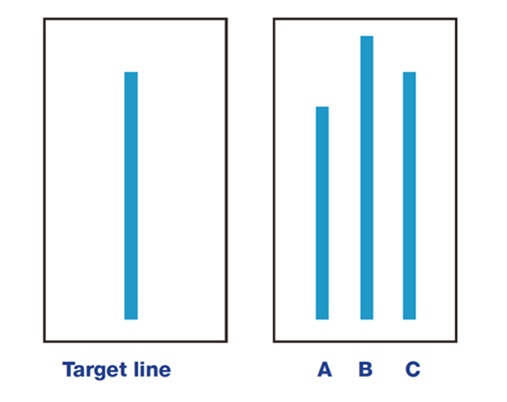
Example of card prompt from conformity experiments

Asch is best known for his conformity experiments. His main finding was that peer pressure can change opinion and even perception. Asch found the majority of the participants succumbed at least once to the pressure and went with the majority.

Asch asked: 1) To what extent do social forces alter people's opinions? 2) Which aspect of the group influence is most important–the size of the majority or unanimity of opinion?

Asch's conformity experiment was conducted using 123 male, white, college students, ranging in age from 17 to 25, who were told that they would be part of an experiment in visual judgment. Each subject was put into a group with 6 to 8 confederates (people who knew the true aims of the experiment, but were introduced as participants to the naive "real" participant). The group was gathered in a classroom and shown a card with a line on it, followed by another card with 3 lines on it labeled 1, 2, and 3. The participants were then asked to say which line matched in length the line on the first card. Each line question was called a "trial". The "real" participant answered last or penultimately. For the first two trials, the subject would feel at ease in the experiment, as he and the other "participants" gave the obvious, correct answer. However, after the fourth trial, all of the confederates respond with the clearly wrong answer at certain points such that in 12 of the 18 trials they all gave the wrong answer. The 12 trials in which the confederates answered incorrectly were the "critical trials". The participant could thus either ignore the majority and go with his own senses or he could go along with the majority and ignore the clearly obvious fact. The aim was to see whether the real participant would change his answer and respond the same way as the confederates or stick with what his eyes plainly told him.

Asch found that 23% of all subjects successfully withstand this form of social pressure, 4.8% completely succumb, while the remainder conform to the majority's manifestly incorrect opinion only in some experimental rounds. Asch suggested that this procedure created a doubt in the participants' mind about the seemingly obvious answer. Participants reported that the correct but rejected line was almost but not quite equal to the standard line. Asch also found that the effectiveness of the group pressure increased significantly from 1 person to 3 people unanimously responding incorrectly. However, there was not much increase after that. He also found that when one confederate responded correctly, the power of the majority to influence the subject decreased substantially.

Asch told his colleagues that his studies of conformity were informed by his childhood experiences in Poland. He recalled being seven years old and staying up for his first Passover night. He recalls seeing his grandmother pour an extra glass of wine. When he asked who the glass of wine was for, she said that it was for the prophet Elijah. He then asked her whether Elijah would really take a sip from the glass and his uncle assured him that he would. His uncle told him to watch very closely when the time came. "Filled with a sense of suggestion and expectation" Asch "thought he saw the level of wine in the cup drop just a bit". Early in life, Asch succumbed to social pressure, an experience which led him to investigate conformity later in life.

=== Normative vs. informational influence ===
Asch's conformity studies have often been used in social psychology to distinguish between two major forms of social influence. In post-experimental interviews, many participants reported that they had realized the group's answer was wrong but still "went along" in order not to stand out. Asch interpreted this pattern as evidence of normative social influence: people publicly conform to gain approval or avoid social costs even when they privately disagree. Later work contrasted this with informational influence, in which people change their judgment because they believe the group is actually correct. A key finding from Asch's variations was that the presence of even a single ally sharply reduced conformity, suggesting that unanimity is an important condition for normative pressure.

=== Metaphors ===
Asch looked at metaphors in a variety of different languages, such as Old Testament Hebrew, Homeric Greek, Chinese, Thai, Malayalam, and Hausa. He found that there was a similar meaning for the sensory term, such as "cold" in English, and the corresponding personality trait. He concluded that metaphors, and thus language, reflects a person's attempt to understand the true properties of a person or object.

=== Unitary and nonunitary associations ===
Asch showed that simple properties would enter into associations much easier, when they are part of the same unit than when they are from different units.

== Notable influences ==
in Asch was Stanley Milgram's advisor at Princeton University. Milgram, under Asch's supervision, completed his dissertation on national/cultural differences in conformity. Asch also influenced the ideas of other social psychologists, including that of Harold Kelley.

== Legacy ==
According to Levine (1999), Asch's research has led to four critical ideas that persist in social influence research. First, Asch believed that social interaction reflects the ability of individual people to synthesize information about group norms, the viewpoints of others and their own perceptions of themselves as group members. This point of view has been manifested in at least two important theories (social identity theory and self-categorization theory), and has been a source of inspiration for the work of many social psychologists.

Second, Asch emphasized that independent thought and disagreement among group members is a cornerstone of group functioning. He believed that only by settling our differences with other group members can we actually understand the shortcomings of our own beliefs. This notion has been embraced by social scientists like Serge Moscovici, who has pursued this rationale as the basis for his theory of minority influence in group situations, and has also been incorporated into sociocognitive conflict theory.Sourcf judgement), and how badly the person wants to be accepted by the group (distortion of action). Although these exact terms have not been directly ported over to the literature, researchers such as Serge Moscovici and Charlan Nemeth have adopted the perspective that majority and minority influence are moderated by multiple processes.

Lastly, Asch suggested that group influence can change how people perceive stimuli (See Asch, 1940 for an example). This is the most obscure of Asch's major ideas, in large part because it has not been cited frequently, but is nonetheless important because it speaks to the power of group influence.

In the 1980s, Asch was disappointed and concerned by the direction social psychology was taking. He wrote, "Why do I sense, together with the current expansion, a shrinking of vision, an expansion of surface rather than depth, a failure of imagination?....Why is not social psychology more exciting, more human in the most usual sense of that term? To sum up, is this discipline perhaps on the wrong track?". Asch was worried that social psychologists were not asking the deeper questions that would help change and improve the world.

== Personal life and death ==
Asch met Florence Miller in a library on East Broadway on the lower East Side in New York City. They married in 1930. Their relationship was reported as being "easy" and "good-humored" (Rock, p. 5). Asch remained married to Florence his entire life. They had their first and only son, Peter, in 1937. Peter Asch became a professor of economics at Rutgers University, married Ruth Zindler and had two sons, Eric and David. Peter died of heart failure at age 52 (predeceasing his parents and his wife).

Asch died at the age of 88 on February 20, 1996, in his home in Haverford, Pennsylvania.

== See also ==
- Belief perseverance
- Milgram experiment
- Stanley Milgram

== Selected work ==
- Asch F. (1989). Letter to Irvin Rock.
- Asch S. E. (1929). A study of scatter on the Stanford revision of the Binet scale. Unpublished MA thesis.
- Asch S. E. (1932a). Personality development of Hopi children. Unpublished paper.
- Asch S. E. (1932b). "An experimental study of variability in learning". Archives of Psychology, 143, 1–55
- Asch S. E. (1940). Studies in the principles of judgements and attitudes: II. Determination of judgements by group and ego standards. Journal of Social Psychology, 12, 433–465.
- Asch S. E. (1946). "Forming impressions of personality". Journal of Abnormal and Social Psychology, 41, 258–290.
- Asch S. E. (1948). "The doctrine of suggestion, prestige, and imitation in social psychology". Psychological Review, 55, 250–276.
- Asch S. E. (1952). "Social psychology". Englewood Cliffs, NJ: Prentice-Hall.
- Asch S. E. (1955). "On the use of metaphor in the description of persons". In H. Werner (Ed.), On expressive language (29–38). Worcester, MA: Clark University Press.
- Asch S. E. (1955). Opinions and Social Pressure.
- Asch S. E. (1956). "Studies of independence and conformity: I. A minority of one against a unanimous majority". Psychological Monographs, 70, 1–70.
- Asch S. E. (1958). "The metaphor: a psychological inquiry". In R. Tagiuri & L. Petrullo (Eds.), Person perception and interpersonal behavior (pp. 86–94), California: Stanford University Press.
- Asch S. E. (1962). "A problem in the theory of associations". Psychologische Beitrage, 6, 553–563.
- Asch S. E. (1964). "The process of free recall". In C. Scheerer (Ed.), Cognition: Theory, research, promise (pp. 79–88). New York: Harper and Row.
- Asch S. E. (1968a). "The doctrinal tyranny of associationism". In T. R. Dixon & D. L. Horton (Eds.), Verbal behavior and general behavior theory (pp. 214–228). Englewood Cliffs, NJ: Prentice-Hall.
- Asch S. E. (1968b). "Wolfgang Köhler". American Journal of Psychology, 81, 110–119.
- Asch S. E. (1969). "A reformulation of the problem of associations". American Psychologist, 24, 92–102.
- Asch S. E., Ceraso J., Heimer W. ( 1960). "Perceptual conditions of association". Psychological Monographs, 74(3), 1–48.
- Asch S. E., Ebenholtz S. M. (1962a). "The principle of associative symmetry". Proceedings of the American Philosophical Society, 106, 135–163.
- Asch S. E., Ebenholtz S. M. (1962b). "The process of free recall: evidence for non-associative factors in acquisition and retention". Journal of Psychology, 54, 3–31.
- Asch S. E., Hay J., & Mendoza R. (1960). "Perceptual organization in serial rote-learning". American Journal of Psychology, 73, 177–198.
- Asch S. E., Lindner M. (1963). "A note on strength of association". Journal of Psychology, 55, 199–209.
- Asch S. E., Prentice W. C. H. (1958). "Paired association with related and unrelated pairs of nonsense figures". American Journal of Psychology, 71, 247–254.
- Asch S. E., Witkin H. A. (1948a). "Studies in space orientation: I. Perception of the upright with displaced visual fields". Journal of Experimental Psychology, 38, 325–337.
- Asch S. E., Witkin H. A. (1948b). "Studies in space orientation: II. Perception of the upright with displaced visual fields and with body tilted". Journal of Experimental Psychology, 38, 455–477.
- Hardin, C. D., Higgins, E. T. (1996). Shared reality: How social verification makes the subjective objective. In R. M. Sorrentino & E. T. Higgins (Eds.), Handbook of motivation and cognition (Vol. 3, pp. 28–84). New York: Guilford.
- Levine, J. M. (1999). Solomon Asch's Legacy for group research. Personality and Social Psychology, 3(4), 358–364.
- Weick, K. E., Roberts, K. H. (1993). Collective mind in organizations: Heedful interrelating on flight decks. Administrative Science Quarterly, 38, 357–381.
