= Scarcity value =

Scarcity value is an economic factor describing the increase in an item's relative price by a low supply. Whereas the prices of newly manufactured products depends mostly on the cost of production (the cost of inputs used to produce them, which in turn reflects the scarcity of the inputs), the prices of many goods—such as antiques, rare stamps, and those raw materials in high demand—reflects the scarcity of the products themselves.

In terms of partial-equilibrium supply and demand, the markets where prices are "cost-determined" have a supply curve that is very elastic or even horizontal, so that an increase in demand raises the quantity of production much more than the price. The price mostly reflects the scarcity of the inputs but not that of the product. On the other hand, those items with scarcity value have inelastic or even vertical supply curves, so that an increase in the demand for the product mostly increases the price and not the quantity supplied. The seller of the product receives a price higher than the cost of producing the item and so receives a significant scarcity rent or producer's surplus when demand is high. Note that the cost of production may be close to zero, as with a rare stamp, so that the entire price consists of scarcity rent.

In a contribution by biologists Courchamp et al. (2006) it is argued that rarity value (as they call scarcity value) may sometimes contribute to the over-exploitation of wildlife or rare biological systems. Rarity leads to a high unit price of a species, hence to higher incentives to catch, which in turn increases rarity, inducing a higher price, higher incentives, and so on. An ongoing example of this kind of economic–biological feedback might be the case of the bluefin tuna.

== In literature ==
In Mark Twain's novel Tom Sawyer, he describes the titular character's revelation regarding a key driver of activity: "Tom said to himself that it was not such a hollow world, after all. He had discovered a great law of human action, without knowing it – namely, that in order to make a man or a boy covet a thing, it is only necessary to make the thing difficult to attain."

== See also ==
- Snob effect
