= Social influence =

Alteration of attitudes and behaviors based on outside influences

Social influence comprises the ways in which individuals adjust their behavior to meet the demands of a social environment. It takes many forms and can be seen in conformity, socialization, peer pressure, obedience, leadership, persuasion, sales, and marketing. Typically social influence results from a specific action, command, or request, but people also alter their attitudes and behaviors in response to what they perceive others might do or think. In 1958, Harvard psychologist Herbert Kelman identified three broad varieties of social influence.

1. Compliance is when people appear to agree with others but actually keep their dissenting opinions private.
2. Identification is when people are influenced by someone who is liked and respected, such as a famous celebrity.
3. Internalization is when people accept a belief or behavior and agree both publicly and privately.

Morton Deutsch and Harold Gerard described two psychological needs that lead humans to conform to the expectations of others. These include our need to be right (informational social influence) and our need to be liked (normative social influence). Informational influence (or social proof) is an influence to accept information from another as evidence about reality. Informational influence comes into play when people are uncertain, either from stimuli being intrinsically ambiguous or because of social disagreement. Normative influence is an influence to conform to the positive expectations of others. In terms of Kelman's typology, normative influence leads to public compliance and identification, whereas informational influence leads to private acceptance and internalization. Beyond these classic forms of social influence, University of Kansas psychologist Christian S Crandall emphasize that imitation, conformity, and social norms form the deeper foundation of how influence works. Humans are biologically prepared to pay attention to others and learn from them, and this shared expectation of what behaviors are appropriate (social norms), shapes nearly all group behavior.

== Types ==
Social influence is a broad term that relates to many different phenomena. Listed below are some major types of social influence that are being researched in social psychology.

=== Kelman's varieties ===
There are three processes of attitude change as defined by Harvard psychologist Herbert Kelman in a 1958 paper published in the Journal of Conflict Resolution. The purpose of defining these processes was to help determine the effects of social influence: for example, to separate public conformity (behavior) from private acceptance (personal belief).

=== Compliance ===
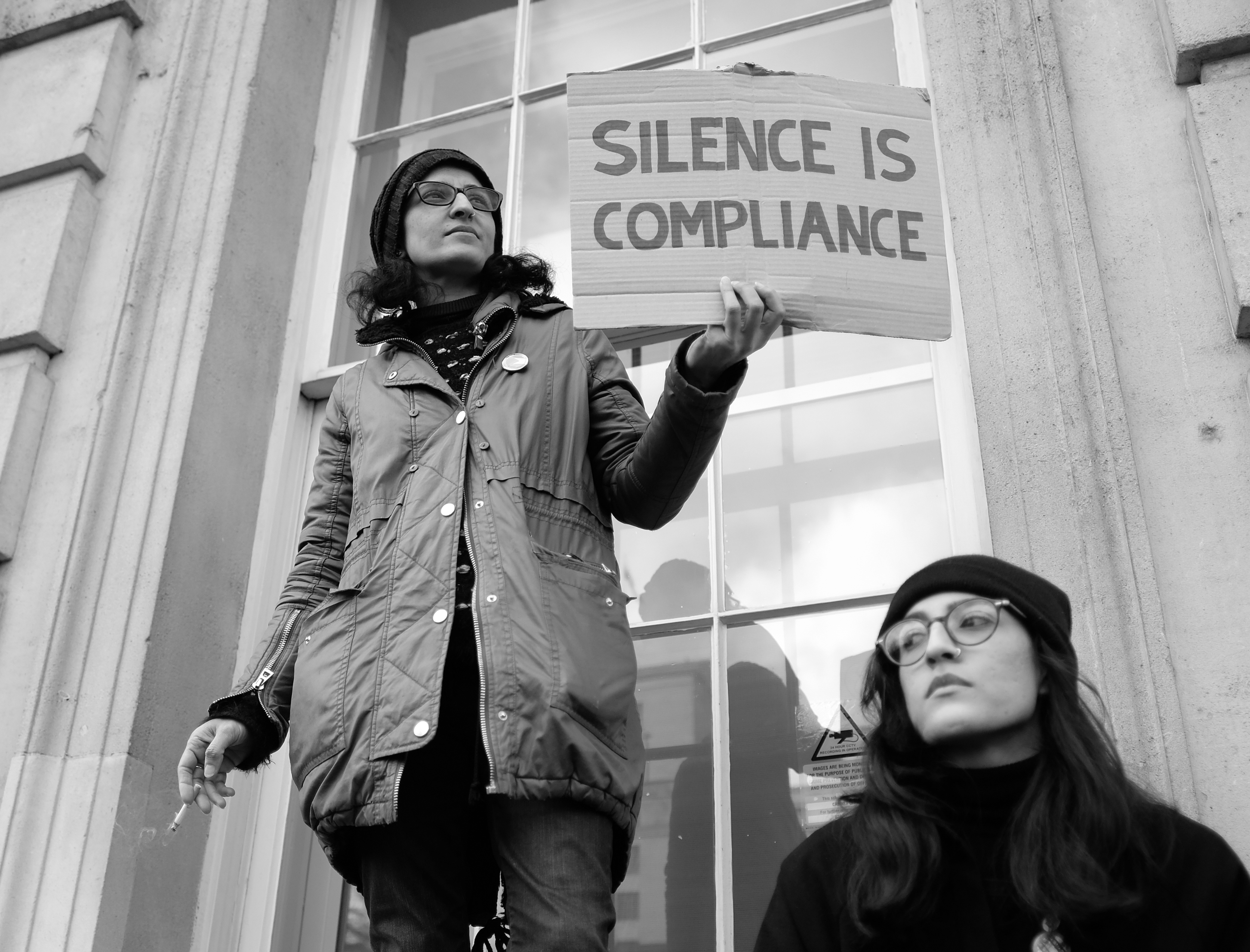
A protester with a placard reading "Silence is Compliance"

Compliance is the act of responding favorably to an explicit or implicit request offered by others. Technically, compliance is a behavior change but not necessarily in attitude; one can comply due to mere obedience or by otherwise opting to withhold private thoughts due to social pressures. According to Kelman's 1958 paper, the satisfaction derived from compliance is due to the social effect of the accepting influence (i.e., people comply for an expected reward or punishment-aversion).

=== Identification ===
Identification is the changing of attitudes or behaviors due to the influence of someone who is admired. Advertisements relying upon celebrity endorsements to market their products are taking advantage of this phenomenon. According to Kelman, the desired relationship that the identifier relates to the behavior or attitude change.

=== Internalization ===
Internalization is the process of acceptance of a set of norms established by people or groups that are influential to the individual. The individual accepts the influence because the content of the influence accepted is intrinsically rewarding. It is congruent with the individual's value system, and according to Kelman the "reward" of internalization is "the content of the new behavior".

=== Conformity ===
Conformity is a type of social influence involving a change in behavior, belief, or thinking to align with those of others or with normative standards. It is the most common and pervasive form of social influence. Social psychology research in conformity tends to distinguish between two varieties: informational conformity (also called social proof, or "internalization" in Kelman's terms ) and normative conformity ("compliance" in Kelman's terms). Christian S Crandall also point out that conformity is rooted in the broader system of social norms,the shared expectations within a group about appropriate behavior. Humans are naturally equipped to learn from and imitate others, so conformity is not just copying what people do, but responding to both descriptive norms (what people typically do) and injunctive norms (what people believe one should do). Experiments by Solomon Asch demonstrated that individuals frequently conform to a clearly incorrect majority, and that the presence of even a single dissenter substantially reduces conformity pressure. Later work found that experiences of social exclusion increase people’s likelihood to conform, suggesting that conformity can function as a strategy to regain social acceptance. Conformity also spreads through norm cascades, in which a small number of people adopting a behavior can trigger rapid group-wide adoption once a critical threshold is reached.

=== Minority influence ===
Researchers have been studying social influence and minority influence for over thirty years. Early research in social psychology emphasized conformity and behaviors that enforced conformity on others. Which created a conformity bias and overshadowed the role of minorities. The first publication covering these topics was written by social psychologist Serge Moscovici and published in 1976. Minority influence takes place when a majority is influenced to accept the beliefs or behaviors of a minority. Minority influence can be affected by the size of majority and minority groups, the level of consistency of the minority group, and situational factors (such as the affluence or social importance of the minority). Moscovici’s more recent research highlights that active minorities, such as social movements, scientific innovators, or emerging artistic groups, play a crucial role in challenging majority norms and driving social change. Minority groups can gain influence by promoting new ideas, and can shift majority beliefs by presenting consistent, confident, and autonomous positions. Minority influence most often operates through informational social influence (as opposed to normative social influence) because the majority may be indifferent to the liking of the minority.

=== Self-fulfilling prophecy ===
A self-fulfilling prophecy is a prediction that directly or indirectly causes itself to become true due to positive feedback between belief and behavior. A prophecy declared as truth (when it is actually false) may sufficiently influence people, either through fear or logical confusion, so that their reactions ultimately fulfill the once-false prophecy. This term is credited to sociologist Robert K. Merton from an article he published in 1948.

=== Social contagion ===
Social contagion involves the spontaneous spread of behaviors or emotions through a group, population or social network. Social contagion consists of two categories, behavioral contagion and emotional contagion. Unlike conformity, the emotion or behavior being adopted may not represent a social norm.

=== Reactance ===
Reactance is the adoption of a view contrary to the view that a person is being pressured to accept, perhaps due to a perceived threat to behavioral freedoms. This phenomenon has also been called anticonformity.According to the Encyclopedia of Social Psychology by Roy F. Baumeister, people become upset when their freedom feels restricted and may deliberately do the opposite of what they are told in an attempt to restore that lost sense of freedom. While the results are the opposite of what the influencer intended, the reactive behavior is a result of social pressure. It is notable that anticonformity does not necessarily mean independence. In many studies, reactance manifests itself in a deliberate rejection of an influence, even if the influence is clearly correct.

=== Obedience ===
Obedience is a form of social influence that derives from an authority figure, based on order or command. The Milgram experiment, Zimbardo's Stanford prison experiment, and the Hofling hospital experiment are three particularly well-known experiments on obedience, and they all conclude that humans are surprisingly obedient in the presence of perceived legitimate authority figures.

=== Persuasion ===
Persuasion is the process of guiding oneself or another toward the adoption of an attitude by rational or symbolic means. US psychologist Robert Cialdini defined six "weapons of influence": reciprocity, commitment, social proof, authority, liking, and scarcity to bring about conformity by directed means. Persuasion can occur through appeals to reason or appeals to emotion.

=== Manipulation ===
Manipulation is defined as an action designed to influence or control another person in an underhanded or subtle manner which facilitates one's personal aims. Methods someone may use to manipulate another person may include seduction, suggestion, coercion, and blackmail. Manipulation is generally considered a dishonest form of social influence as it is used at the expense of others. Humans are inherently capable of manipulative and deceptive behavior, with the main differences being that of specific personality characteristics or disorders.

Manipulation differs from general influence and persuasion. Manipulation, unlike persuasion, typically involves exploiting the vulnerabilities of an individual.

Manipulative behavior is fundamentally deliberate and intentional, with the manipulator knowing full well the consequences of their actions, and what they want out of the person being manipulated.

=== Controlling behavior ===
Controlling individuals use various tactics to abuse their victims. Tactics may include coercion and threats, intimidation, emotional abuse, isolation, and more. The goal of the abuser is to control and intimidate the victim or to influence them to feel that they do not have an equal voice in the relationship. Political entities may employ patterns of similar techniques in the exertion of abusive power and control over persons subject to them.

=== Propaganda ===
Propaganda is information that is not objective and is used primarily to influence an audience and further an agenda, often by presenting facts selectively to encourage a particular synthesis or perception, or using loaded language to produce an emotional rather than a rational response to the information that is presented.

=== Hard power ===
Hard power is the use of military and economic means to influence the behavior or interests of other political bodies. This form of political power is often aggressive (coercion), and is most effective when imposed by one political body upon another of lesser military and/or economic power. Hard power contrasts with soft power, which comes from diplomacy, culture and history.

Psychologist Bertram H. Raven (1964) defines social influence as any change in a person’s thoughts, attitudes, or behavior that originates from another individual or group. He outlines several distinct bases of social power, beginning with informational influence, in which change results from the content or logic of a communication rather than the communicator themselves. Raven also describes coercive and reward power, forms of influence that rely on the perceived ability of a person to administer punishments or provide benefits. Additional sources of power include expert power, which emerges when individuals defer to those believed to possess superior knowledge, and referent power, in which individuals adjust their attitudes or behaviors to align with people or groups they identify with.

== Antecedents ==
Many factors can affect the impact of social influence.

=== Collective Identity ===
Collective identity or group identity is a shared sense of belonging to a group. In Social Influence and Group Identity, Russel Spears (2021) explains that much of what shapes people’s attitudes and behaviors comes from the social groups they identify with, drawing on classic self-categorization theory by JC Turner(1987, 1991) that argues people conform to group norms when those norms feel self-relevant. Research shows that group identity strengthens conformity in famous studies like Sherif’s autokinetic illusion experiments and Asch’s line-judgment paradigm. Spears also contrasts identity-based influence with other explanations as a distinction between descriptive and injunctive norms. Showing that group identity can shape not only behavior but perceived moral obligations.

=== Social impact theory ===
Social impact theory was developed by Bibb Latané in 1981. This theory asserts that there are three factors which increase a person's likelihood to respond to social influence:

- Strength: The importance of the influencing group to the individual
- Immediacy: Physical (and temporal) proximity of the influencing group to the individual at the time of the influence attempt
- Number: The number of people in the group

=== Cialdini's "weapons of influence" ===
Robert Cialdini defines six "weapons of influence" that can contribute to an individual's propensity to be influenced by a persuader:

- Reciprocity: People tend to return a favor.
- Commitment and consistency: People do not like to be self-contradictory. Once they commit to an idea or behavior, they are averse to changing their minds without good reason.
- Social proof: People will be more open to things that they see others doing. For example, seeing others compost their organic waste after finishing a meal may influence the subject to do so as well.
- Authority: People will tend to obey authority figures.
- Liking: People are more easily swayed by people they like.
- Scarcity: A perceived limitation of resources will generate demand.

=== Unanimity ===
Social Influence is strongest when the group perpetrating it is consistent and committed. Even a single instance of dissent can greatly wane the strength of an influence. For example, in Milgram's first set of obedience experiments, 65% of participants complied with fake authority figures to administer "maximum shocks" to a confederate. In iterations of the Milgram experiment where three people administered shocks (two of whom were confederates), once one confederate disobeyed, only ten percent of subjects administered the maximum shocks.

=== Status ===
Those perceived as experts may exert social influence as a result of their perceived expertise. This involves credibility, a tool of social influence from which one draws upon the notion of trust. People believe an individual to be credible for a variety of reasons, such as perceived experience, attractiveness, knowledge, etc. Additionally, pressure to maintain one's reputation and not be viewed as fringe may increase the tendency to agree with the group. This phenomenon is known as groupthink. Appeals to authority may especially affect norms of obedience. The compliance of normal humans to authority in the famous Milgram experiment demonstrates the power of perceived authority.

Power is one of the biggest reasons an individual feels the need to follow through with the suggestions of another. A person who possesses more authority (or is perceived as being more powerful) than others in a group is an icon or is most "popular" within a group. This person has the most influence over others. For example, in a child's school life, people who seem to control the perceptions of the students at school are most powerful in having a social influence over other children.

=== Culture ===
Culture appears to play a role in the willingness of an individual to conform to the standards of a group. Stanley Milgram found that conformity was higher in Norway than in France. This has been attributed to Norway's longstanding tradition of social responsibility, compared to France's cultural focus on individualism. Japan likewise has a collectivist culture and thus a higher propensity to conformity. However, a 1970 Asch-style study found that when alienated, Japanese students were more susceptible to anticonformity (giving answers that were incorrect even when the group had collaborated on correct answers) one-third of the time, significantly higher than has been seen in Asch studies in the past.

While gender does not significantly affect a person's likelihood to conform, under certain conditions gender roles do affect such a likelihood. Studies from the 1950s and 1960s concluded that women were more likely to conform than men. However a 1971 study found that experimenter bias was involved; all of the researchers were male, while all of the research participants were female. Studies thereafter found that the likelihood to conform is almost equal between the genders. Furthermore, men conformed more often when faced with traditionally feminine topics, and women conformed more often when presented with masculine topics. In other words, ignorance about a subject can lead a person to defer to "social proof".

=== Emotions ===
Emotion and disposition may affect an individual's likelihood of conformity or anticonformity. In 2009, a study concluded that fear increases the chance of agreeing with a group, while romance or lust increases the chance of going against the group.

== Social structure ==
=== Social networks ===
A social network is a social structure made up of nodes (representing individuals or organizations) which are connected (through ties, also called edges, connections, or links) by one or more types of interdependency (such as friendship, common interests or beliefs, sexual relations, or kinship). Social network analysis uses the lens of network theory to examine social relationships. Social network analysis as a field has become more prominent since the mid-20th century in determining the channels and effects of social influence. For example, Christakis and Fowler found that social networks transmit states and behaviors such as obesity, smoking, drinking and happiness.

However, important flaws have been identified in the contagion model for social influence which is assumed and used in many of the above studies. In order to address these flaws, causal inference methods have been proposed instead, to systematically disentangle social influence from other possible confounding causes when using observational data.

== Global approach to the phenomenon of influence ==
=== Provisional introduction ===
As described above, theoretical approaches are in the form of knowledge clusters. The global theory of influence is missing for an easy understanding and an education to protect from manipulators. A first tentative was published in 2012. The first pages of Influence & Systems explain why a global approach is necessary.

== See also ==
- Artificial intelligence and elections
- Authority bias
- Bystander effect
- Group decision-making
- Influence-for-hire
- Impression management
- Judge–advisor system
- Popularity
- Response bias
- Social-desirability bias
- Social influence bias
