= Herbert Kelman =

American psychologist (1927–2022)

Herbert C. Kelman
- Born: Herbert Chanoch Kelman; March 18, 1927; Vienna, Austria
- Died: March 1, 2022 (aged 94); Massachusetts, U.S
- Education: Yale University
- Scientific career
- Fields: Psychology
- Thesis: Attitude Change as a Function of Response Restriction (1951)
- Doctoral advisor: Carl Hovland
- Doctoral students: Alice Eagly

Herbert Chanoch Kelman (March 18, 1927 – March 1, 2022) was an Austrian-born American psychologist who was the Richard Clarke Cabot Professor of Social Ethics at Harvard University. He is known for his work on conflict resolution in the Middle East.

== Early life ==
Kelman was born in Vienna, Austria, the son of Antonia/Lea and Leo Kelman. His family fled the rise of fascism and anti-Semitism, heading first to Belgium and then, in 1940, the United States. Kelman married Rose Brousman in August, 1953. He was educated at Brooklyn College, where he majored in English and Psychology, and the Seminary College of Jewish Studies. He went on to receive his master's degree and doctorate in social psychology at Yale University in 1951.

== Career ==
Kelman did post-doctoral work at Johns Hopkins University while also spending time teaching psychology at the Baltimore College of Commerce. After a stint at the National Institute of Mental Health, Kelman served as a lecturer on Social Psychology at Harvard University (1957–1962). He was a professor of psychology at the University of Michigan (1962–1969) before returning to Harvard in 1968, where he remained for the rest of his career. Kelman also held countless fellowships and visiting positions.

In 1971, Kelman helped circulate a petition calling on faculty members at Harvard to refuse to pay their federal telephone excise tax in protest against the U.S. war against Vietnam.

Inspired by the scholarship of John Burton, Kelman organized tens of unofficial gatherings of Arabs and Israelis. In 1989, he facilitated an off-the-record meeting between members of the P.L.O. and Israeli politicians and academics in an effort to bring the two sides closer on important issues.

On August 1, 2003, the Program on International Conflict Analysis and Resolution, under the leadership of Kelman, was closed. The Vienna-based Herbert C. Kelman Institute for Interactive Conflict Transformation was renamed in his honor in December 2010.

Kelman was also on the advisory board of Faculty for Israeli-Palestinian Peace–USA (FFIPP–USA), a network of Palestinian, Israeli, and international faculty and students working to end the Israeli occupation of Palestinian territories and for peace.

Kelman was president of a number of academic societies including the Society for the Psychological Study of Social Issues (1964–1965), the Peace Science Society (1975–1976), the Interamerican Society of Psychology (1976–1979), the International Studies Association (1978–1979), the International Society of Political Psychology (1985–1986), and the Psychologists for Social Responsibility (1990–1992).

== Personal life ==
Kelman died in Cambridge, Massachusetts, on March 1, 2022, at the age of 94.

== Awards ==
Kelman was the recipient of the 2000 James McKeen Cattell Fellow Award from the Association for Psychological Science in part for his service as "a model of the social responsibility of psychologists". Kelman is a recipient of the 1997 University of Louisville Grawemeyer Award for Ideas Improving World Order. He was the winner of the 1956 AAAS Prize for Behavioral Science Research.

== See also ==
- Social influence
