= Normative social influence =

Type of social influence

Normative social influence is a type of social influence that leads to conformity. It is defined in social psychology as "...the influence of other people that leads us to conform in order to be liked and accepted by them." The power of normative social influence stems from the human identity as a social being, with a need for companionship and association.

Normative social influence involves a change in behaviour that is deemed necessary in order to fit in a particular group. The need for a positive relationship with the people around leads us to conformity. This fact often leads to people exhibiting public compliance—but not necessarily private acceptance—of the group's social norms in order to be accepted by the group. Social norms refers to the unwritten rules that govern social behavior. These are customary standards for behavior that are widely shared by members of a culture.

In many cases, normative social influence serves to promote social cohesion. When a majority of group members conform to social norms, the group generally becomes more stable. This stability translates into social cohesion, which allows group members to work together toward a common understanding, or "good", but also has the unintended impact of making the group members less individualistic.

== Research ==
=== Classic research ===
In 1955, Solomon Asch conducted his classic conformity experiments in an attempt to discover if people still conform when the right answer is obvious. Specifically, he asked participants in his experiment to judge the similarity of lines, an easy task by objective standards. Using accomplices to the plot, also known as confederates, Asch created the illusion that an entire group of participants believed something that was clearly false (i.e., that dissimilar lines were actually similar). In this situation, participants conformed over 36% of the time on trials where the confederates gave blatantly false answers. When asked to make the judgments in private, participants gave the right answer more than 99% of the time. Asch's results cannot be explained by informational social influence, because in this case, the task was easy and the correct answer was obvious. Thus, participants were not necessarily looking to others to figure out the right answer, as informational social influence predicts. Instead, they were seeking acceptance and avoiding disapproval. Follow-up interviews with participants of the original Asch studies confirmed this. When participants were asked why they conformed, many provided reasons other than a need for accuracy.

=== Current research ===
In more current research, Schultz (1999) found that households that received more normative messages describing the frequency and amount of weekly recycling began to have a direct impact on both the households' frequency and amount of their curbside recycling. The sudden change was due to the fact that "the other neighbors'" recycling habits had a direct normative effect on the household to change their recycling behaviors. Similar results were apparent in another study in which researchers were able to increase household energy conservation through the use of normative messages. Participants in this conservation study did not believe that such normative messages could influence their behavior; they attributed their conservation efforts to environmental concerns or social responsibility needs. Thus, normative social influence can be a very powerful, yet unconscious, motivator of behavior.

=== Consequences ===
Lastly, different studies have illustrated the consequences of deviation from a group's influence. In a study by Schachter (1951), participants were placed in groups and asked to discuss what to do with a juvenile delinquent they had read about. A "deviant" was instructed by the experimenter to take a stand strongly opposing that of the rest of the group and to hold this position in the midst of any arguments from other members. After the conclusion of the discussions, participants chose to reject this deviant the most, considering him the least desirable of the members, and relegating him to the least important tasks. Recent work by Berns et al. (2005) examined the physiological effects of deviation by using fMRI to scan participants' brains as they completed an object rotation task with other "participants", who were actually confederates. The researchers were interested in examining participants' brain activity when they were under pressure to conform to an incorrect group majority. The amygdala region (which is associated with negative emotions) was activated when participants sought to break off from the influence of the majority; providing support for the point that resisting normative social influence can often lead to negative emotional consequences for individuals.

== Affecting factors ==
=== Social impact theory ===
Latane's social impact theory posits that three factors influence the extent to which we conform to group norms: personal importance, immediacy, and size. As the group becomes more important to a person, physically closer to him/her, and larger in number, Social Impact Theory predicts that conformity to group norms will increase. However, the size of the group only affects conformity to an extent—as a group expands past 3–5 members, the effect levels off.

=== Unanimity ===
When a group is unanimous in its support of a norm, an individual feels greater pressure to follow suit. However, even a small break in unanimity can lead to a decrease in the power of such normative influence. In Asch's study, when even one other confederate dissented from the majority and provided the correct answer, the participant answered incorrectly on fewer trials (about a fourth less). In addition, participants experienced positive emotions towards such dissenters. A similar reduction in conformity even occurred when the dissenting confederate provided an answer that was false (but still different from that of the majority).

In some versions of the experiment, Asch had dissenting confederates eventually rejoin the majority opinion after several trials; when this occurred, participants experienced greater pressure from normative influence and conformed as if they had never had the dissenter on their side. However, when the conditions were altered and the dissenting confederate left the room after several trials, the participants did not experience a similar pressure to conform as they had when the confederate rejoined the majority—they made fewer mistakes than they had in the condition where the confederate rejoined the others.

=== Private vs. public ===
The pressure to bend to normative influence increases for actions performed in public, whereas this pressure decreases for actions done in private. In another variation of the Asch study, the researchers allowed the participant to privately write down his answer after all of the confederates had publicly stated their answers; this variation reduced the level of conformity among participants. In addition, the control condition of the Asch study revealed that participants were almost perfectly accurate when answering independently.

=== Minority influence ===
It is possible for a vocal minority to stem the normative influence of a larger majority. In the versions of the Asch study where a dissenter was inserted into the group (see Unanimity section), his presence as a minority member gave the participant the confidence to exert his independence to a greater extent. However, as soon as the dissenter waffled on his opinions and rejoined the majority, participant conformity increased. Thus, a minority must consistently stand by its beliefs to be effective.

In addition, there are other factors that increase the power of the minority: when the majority is forced to think about the beliefs and perspective of the minority, when the majority and minority are similar to one another, and when the minority exhibits some willingness to compromise and be flexible, although there is debate over the degree to which consistency and compromise should be balanced.

It is often the case that whereas a majority influences public compliance with a norm, a minority can engender private acceptance of a new norm, with the result often being conversion (public and private acceptance of a norm).

=== Cultural differences ===
There is a distinction between individualistic (e.g., United States) and collectivistic (e.g., Japan) cultures. While some predict that collectivistic cultures would exhibit stronger conformity under normative social influence, this is not necessarily the case—the identity of the group acts as a potential moderator. Because collectivists emphasize the importance of in-group members (e.g., family and friends), normative pressure from in-groups can lead to higher conformity than pressures from strangers.

=== Gender differences ===
Many have long wondered whether there is a gender gap in conformity under normative influence, with women possibly conforming more than men. A meta-analysis by Eagly and Carli (1981) shows that this gap is small, and driven by public vs. private situations. Women do conform (slightly) more under normative influence than do men when in public situations as opposed to private ones. Eagly and Carli found that male researchers reported higher levels of conformity among female participants than did female researchers; the authors speculate that each gender could be implicitly biased towards portraying itself in a positive light, thus leading to actions (e.g., setting up experimental conditions under which males or females may be more comfortable) that might favor one gender over the other.

== Examples ==
Fashion choices are often impacted by normative social influence. To feel accepted by a particular crowd, men and women often dress similarly to individuals in that group. Fashion conformity promotes social cohesion within the group and can be a result of both conscious and unconscious motivations.

Similar to fashion conformity, the male and the female views of the ideal body image are often affected by normative social influence. Social media and marketing helps to portray what is commonly considered the current view of physical attractiveness by the masses. As each generation defines the ideal female figure, women feel the pressure to conform to avoid the disapproval of others. Likewise, as society continues to define the ideal male body type as muscular and fit, men also come under pressure to conform, which often leads to changes in eating habits to reach that ideal.

== See also ==
- Acceptance
- Cheer
- Applause
- Groupthink
- Obedience
- Normative
- Social control
