= Social proof =

Psychological phenomenon regarding conformity

Social proof (or informational social influence) is a psychological and social phenomenon wherein people copy the actions of others in choosing how to behave in a given situation. The term was coined by Robert Cialdini in his 1984 book Influence: Science and Practice.

Social proof is used in ambiguous social situations where people are unable to determine the appropriate mode of behavior, and is driven by the assumption that the surrounding people possess more knowledge about the current situation.

The effects of social influence can be seen in the tendency of large groups to conform. This is referred to in some publications as the herd behavior. Although social proof reflects a rational motive to take into account the information possessed by others, formal analysis shows that it can cause people to converge too quickly upon a single distinct choice, so that decisions of even larger groups of individuals may be grounded in very little information (see information cascades).

Social proof is one type of conformity. When a person is in a situation where they are unsure of the correct way to behave, they will often look to others for clues concerning the correct behavior. When "we conform because we believe that others' interpretation of an ambiguous situation is more accurate than ours and will help us choose an appropriate course of action", it is informational social influence. This is contrasted with normative social influence wherein a person conforms to be liked or accepted by others.

Social proof often leads not only to public compliance (conforming to the behavior of others publicly without necessarily believing it is correct) but also private acceptance (conforming out of a genuine belief that others are correct). Social proof is more powerful when being accurate is more important and when others are perceived as especially knowledgeable.

== Mechanisms ==
=== Uncertainty about the correct conclusion ===
Uncertainty is a major factor that encourages the use of social proof. One study found that when evaluating a product, consumers were more likely to incorporate the opinions of others through the use of social proof when their own experiences with the product were ambiguous, leaving uncertainty as to the correct conclusion that they should make.

=== Similarity to the surrounding group ===
Similarity also motivates the use of social proof; when a person perceives themselves as similar to the people around them, they are more likely to adopt and perceive as correct the observed behavior of these people. This has been noted in areas such as the use of laugh tracks, where participants will laugh longer and harder when they perceive the people laughing to be similar to themselves.

Social proof is also one of Robert Cialdini's six principles of persuasion, (along with reciprocity, commitment/consistency, authority, liking, and scarcity) which maintains that people are especially likely to perform certain actions if they can relate to the people who performed the same actions before them. One experiment which exemplifies this claim was conducted by researchers who joined a door-to-door charity campaign, who found that if a list of prior donators was longer, the next person solicited was more likely to donate as well. This trend was even more pronounced when the names on the donor list were people that the prospective donor knew, such as friends and neighbors. Cialdini's principle also asserts that peer power is effective because people are more likely to respond to influence tactics applied horizontally rather than vertically, so people are more likely to be persuaded by a colleague than a superior.

== Research ==
=== Early research ===
The most famous study of social proof is Muzafer Sherif's 1935 experiment. In this experiment subjects were placed in a dark room and asked to look at a dot of light about 15 feet away. They were then asked how much, in inches, the dot of light was moving. In reality it was not moving at all, but due to the autokinetic effect it appeared to move. How much the light appears to move varies from person to person but is generally consistent over time for each individual. A few days later a second part of the experiment was conducted. Each subject was paired with two other subjects and asked to give out loud their estimate of how much the light was moving. Even though the subjects had previously given different estimates, the groups would come to a common estimate. To rule out the possibility that the subjects were simply giving the group answer to avoid looking foolish while still believing their original estimate was correct, Sherif had the subjects judge the lights again by themselves after doing so in the group. They maintained the group's judgment. Because the movement of the light is ambiguous the participants were relying on each other to define reality.

Another study looked at informational social influence in eyewitness identification. Subjects were shown a slide of the "perpetrator". They were then shown a slide of a line-up of four men, one of whom was the perpetrator they had seen, and were asked to pick him out. The task was made difficult to the point of ambiguity by presenting the slides very quickly. The task was done in a group that consisted of one actual subject and three confederates (a person acting as a subject but actually working for the experimenter). The confederates answered first and all three gave the same wrong answer. In a high-importance condition of the experiment, subjects were told that they were participating in a real test of eyewitness identification ability that would be used by police departments and courts, and that their scores would establish the norm for performance. In a low-importance condition, subjects were told that the slide task was still being developed and that the experimenters had no idea what the norm for performance was—they were just looking for useful hints to improve the task. It was found that when subjects thought the task was of high importance, they were more likely to conform, giving the confederate's wrong answer 51% of the time, as opposed to 35% of the time in the low-importance condition.

=== Cultural effects on social proof ===
The strength of social proof also varies across different cultures. For instance, studies have shown that subjects in collectivist cultures conform to others' social proof more often than those in individualist cultures. Although this trend seems reoccurring, there is evidence which suggests that these results are a simplification, and that an independent subject's personal individualistic-collectivist tendency also makes an impact upon their decisions. Additional variables, such as the subject's sense of social responsibility, need to be taken into account to better understand the mechanisms of social proof across cultures; for example, more collectivist individuals will often have an increased compulsion to help others because of their prominent awareness of social responsibility, and this in turn will increase the likelihood they will comply to requests, regardless of their peers' previous decisions.

=== Copycat suicides ===
Social proof has been proposed as an explanation for copycat suicide, where suicide rates increase following media publication about suicides. One study using agent-based modeling showed that copycat suicides are more likely when there are similarities between the person involved in the publicized suicide and the potential copycats. In addition, research performed by David Phillips between 1947 and 1968 further supports the existence of copycat suicides.

== Examples ==
=== Historical ===
The adoption and popularity of tulips in the Netherlands and Germany after they had been imported from Constantinople by Conrad Gessner in 1559 has been seen as an example of a fashion spread by social proof.

=== In entertainment ===
Theaters sometimes use specially planted audience members who are instructed to give ovations at pre-arranged times. Usually, these people are the ones who clap initially, and the rest of the audience follows. Such ovations may be perceived by non-expert audience members as signals of the performance's quality.

In television shows, television studios have discovered that they can increase the perceived "funniness" of a show by playing a pre-recorded laugh track at key moments. They have found that even though viewers find a laugh track annoying, they perceive shows that use canned laughter to be funnier than those that do not.

=== In e-commerce ===
In e-commerce, social proof takes the form of positive testimonials from previous customers. Showcasing these testimonials is one of the tactics that is found to be effective in encouraging potential customers to sign up.

=== In social media ===
Social proof is exploited on social networks such as X (formerly Twitter), Facebook, Instagram and YouTube. The number of followers, fans, views, likes, favorites and even comments that a user has made, positively affects how other users perceive them. A user on X with a million followers is perceived as more trustworthy and reputable than a similar user with a thousand followers, resulting in faster growth of followers and higher engagement and click-through-rates.

== See also ==
- Argumentum ad populum
- Bandwagon effect
- Bystander effect
- Conventional wisdom
- Critical mass (sociodynamics)
- Crowd psychology
- FOMO, Fear Of Missing Out
- Herd mentality
- Information cascades
- Knowledge falsification
- Observational learning
- Peer pressure
- Preference falsification
- Positional good
- Shill
- The Third Wave
- Tipping point (sociology)
