= Fascination with death =

Human interest throughout history

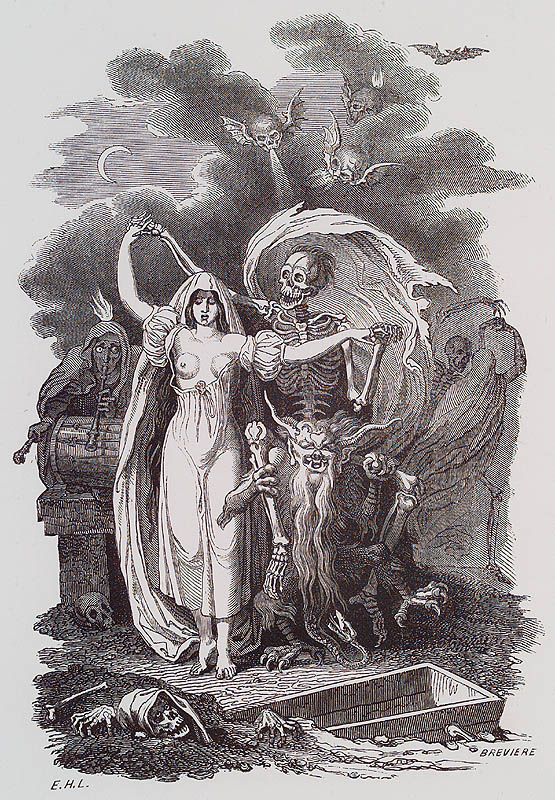
'Seductive death' by Eustache-Hyacinthe Langlois

Fascination with death has occurred throughout human history, characterized by obsessions with death and all things related to death and the afterlife.

In past times, and present, people would form cults around death and figures. Famously, Anubis, Osiris, Hades, and La Santa Muerte have all had large cult followings. La Santa Muerte (Saint Death), or the personification of death, is currently worshiped by many in Mexico and other countries in Central America. Day of the Dead (2 November) is a celebration for the dead.

== History ==
The ancient Egyptians are most famous for their fascination of death by mummifying their dead and building exquisite tombs, like the pyramids of Giza, for their dead. Many of their deities were death-related, such as: Ammut, the devourer of unworthy souls; Anubis, the guardian of the Necropolis and the keeper of poisons, medicines, and herbs; and Osiris, the king of the dead.

The Greek underworld, Hades, was ruled by the god Hades, and had five rivers that flowed through it. The rivers were: Acheron, river of sadness; Cocytus, river of lamentation; Lethe, river of forgetfulness; Phlegethon, river of fire; Styx, river of hate. The Underworld had attendants who, though not rulers, were important gods and beings. The Furies were female spirits who exacted vengeance against people who committed specific crimes. Keres were female spirits of death and destruction. Persephone was the goddess of the underworld and the spouse of Hades. Thanatos, the god of death, was said to wear dark robes.

The Vikings believed that if a warrior died in battle, he would be taken to the Norse afterlife: the hall of Valhalla, in which the warriors would prepare for Ragnarǫk, the battle at the end of the world. Rune stones were erected to commemorate particularly brave warriors. Death in one's sleep (a "straw death") was considered dishonorable.

=== Modern Western culture ===
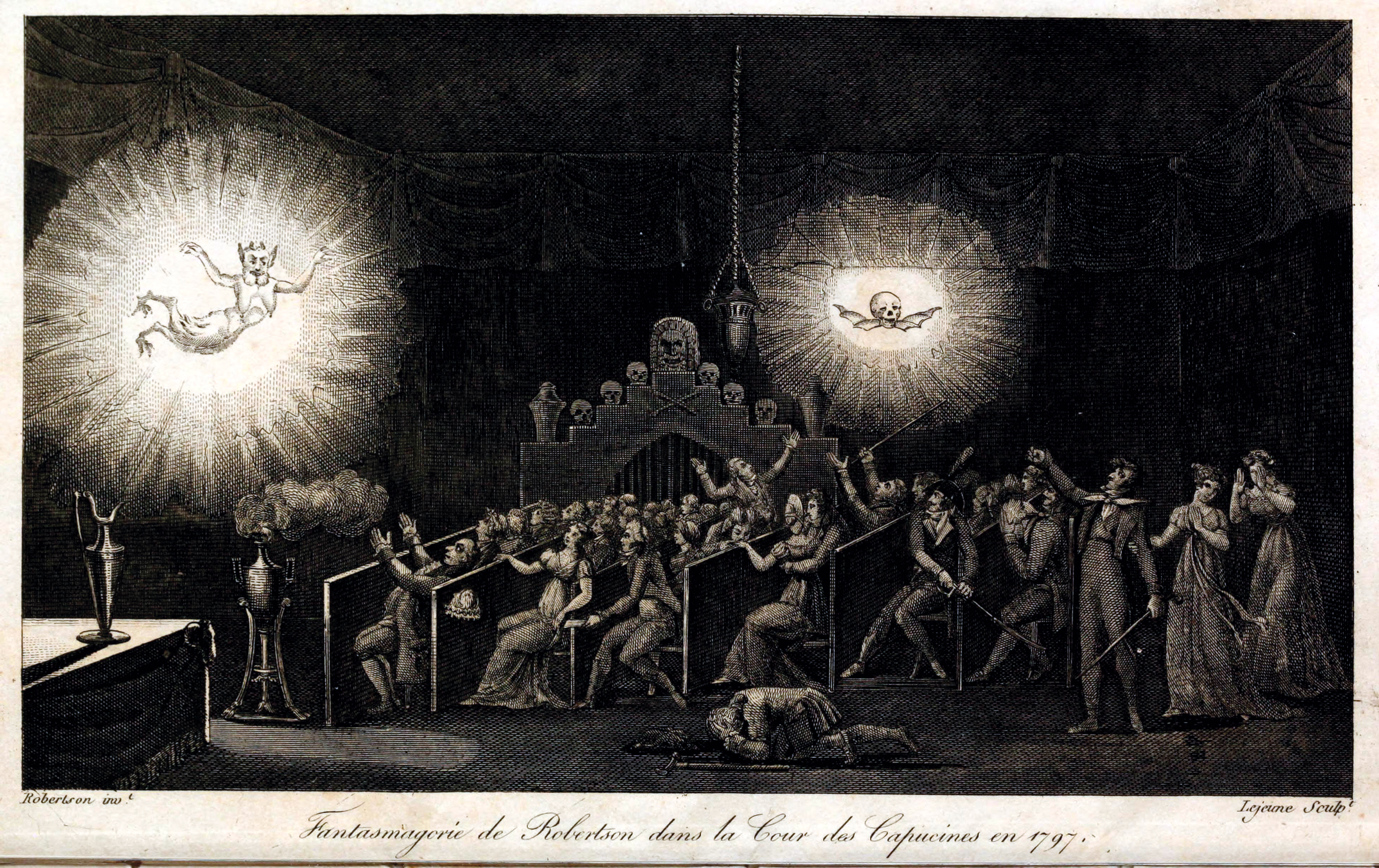
Étienne-Gaspard Robert offered phantasmagorias projecting skeletons and ghosts. A 1831 engraving of a 1797 show in Paris.

In the early part of the 20th century, it was common to hold séances at dinner parties. A séance is an event where a group of people (3 or more) try to communicate with the dead through one person of the group, known as a psychic medium.

Today there are a number of authors who have spoken on the fascination people have with death. "If it bleeds, it leads" is a phrase related to this, meaning that in the mass media most of the material is based on death. For example: death and crime are almost always a topic in the news. The goth and metal subcultures are often associated with death and dying.

Daniel Kahneman and others have studied the psychology behind this. For example, people buy insurance and make other decisions based on what comes readily to mind—e.g., the previously recorded high-water mark for a flood, rarely considering that something worse is possible and in many cases eventually likely. This interacts with the management policies of media outlets to create availability cascades and media feeding frenzies: For example, "strokes cause almost twice as many deaths as all accidents combined, but 80% of respondents [in a survey] judged accidental death to be more likely. ... [This is because media] coverage is itself biased toward novelty and poignancy. The media do not just shape what the public is interested in, but also are shaped by it."

This fascination with death and interaction with media editorial policies sometimes has problematic consequences for public policy. For example, Vincent Sacco and others described how the mainstream commercial media in the United States changed their editorial policies in the 1970s to focus more on the police blotter. The human psychology behind "If it bleeds, it leads" meant they could retain or even increase their audience while reducing the cost of producing the news: Investigative journalism is enormously expensive, especially if it offends a major advertiser. Focusing on crimes apparently committed by people without substantive political or economic power is cheap.

== Necrophilia ==
'Necrophilia' is generally used in English to refer to the paraphilia associated with dead bodies, although the term has been used in a broader sense and in foreign language merely to refer to 'a fascination with death.'

== See also ==
- Thanatology
- Mean world syndrome
