= Spreader bar (angling) =

Tool used by sportfishermen to catch tuna

A spreader bar

In angling, a spreader bar, also known as a tracker bird, wide tracker, offset spreader bar, and a side-tracker bar, is a tool used by sportfishermen for catching tuna and swordfish.

The premise of a spreader bar is that it uses a collection of "bait" lures which resemble small squid and which are spread out and hanging from a metal bar which is submerged in the water. Only one of these lures, called the "stinger", has a hook in it. The stinger is hung slightly behind the other lures, causing it to resemble a straggler-- this makes it appear to be the easiest prey item for the tuna to catch, and the most likely to be struck. The set of lures appears to the tuna as a small school of squid that has become separated from a much larger bait ball and therefore highly vulnerable to predation.

Most are made of titanium alloys in order to endure the constant exposure to sea water and the rough handling when struck by the game fish.
