= Public intelligence =

Public intelligence may refer to:

- Collective intelligence
- Common knowledge
- Public Intelligence (a special application of Open-source Intelligence)
