= Ball of fish =

Ball of fish may refer to:

- Fish ball, a common food in Asian cuisine made from finely ground fish
- Bait ball, a defensive behavior exhibited by pelagic fish
