= Feeding frenzy =

Type of animal group activity

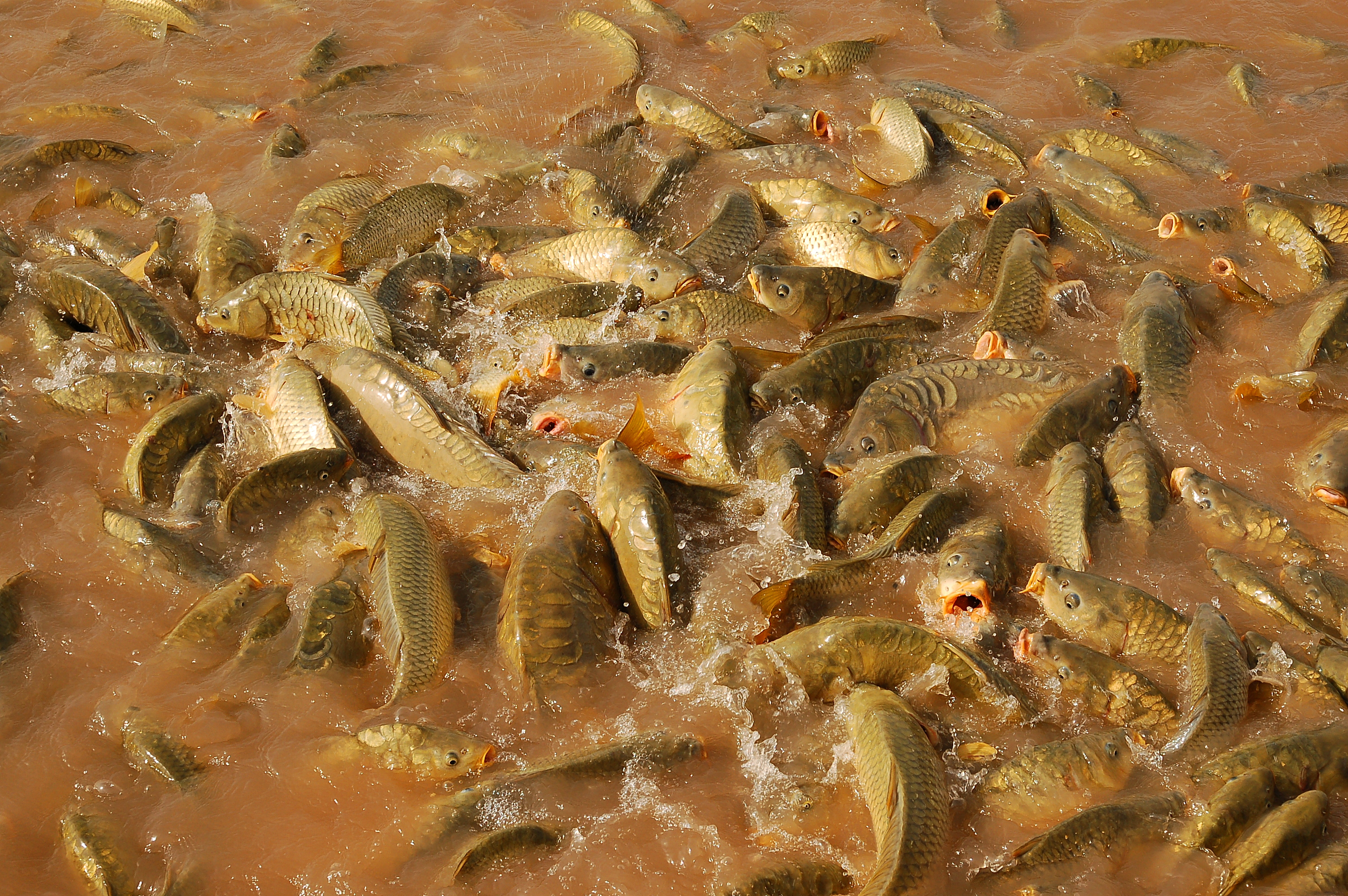
Common carp (Cyprinus carpio) competing for food at the pond of the Royal Palace Agdal of Marrakesh in Morocco

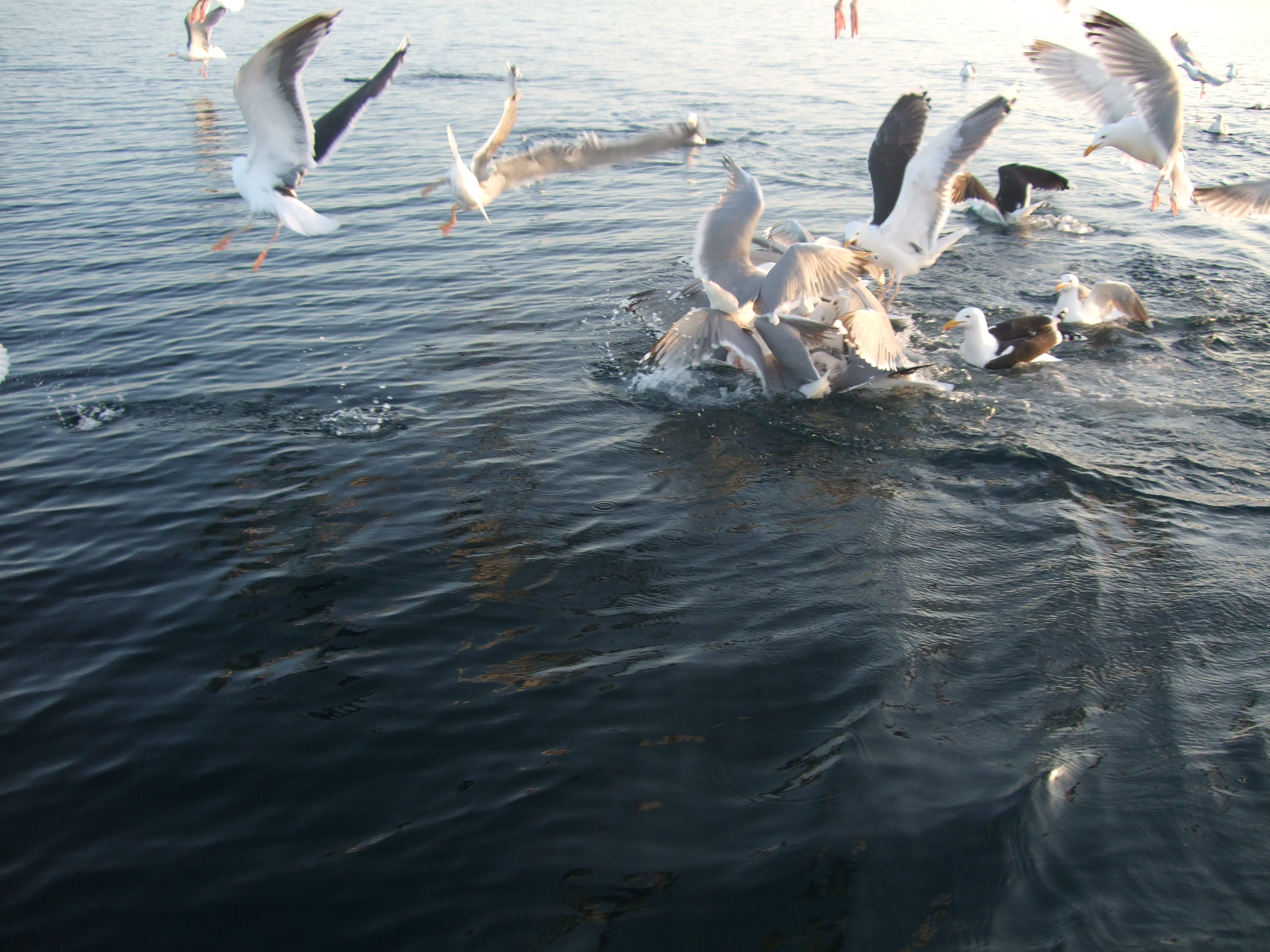
Herring gulls (Larus argentatus) and great black-backed gulls (Larus marinus) in Vestfjord, Norway eating fish remnants after fishers cleaned their catch.

In ecology, a feeding frenzy is a type of animal group activity that occurs when predators are overwhelmed by the amount of prey available. The term is also used as an idiom in the English language.

== Examples in nature ==
For example, a large school of fish can cause nearby sharks, such as the lemon shark, to enter into a feeding frenzy. This can cause the sharks to go wild, biting anything that moves, including each other or anything else within biting range. Another functional explanation for feeding frenzy is competition amongst predators. This term is most often used when referring to sharks or piranhas.

== English language uses ==
It has also been used as a term within journalism.

The term is occasionally used to describe a plethora of something. For instance, a 2016 Bloomberg News article is entitled: "March Madness Is a Fantasy Sports Feeding Frenzy." In economics the term can be used to describe the economics of the music industry, as large music companies acquired smaller music companies.

== See also ==
- Bait ball
- Proverb
- Comprehension of idioms
- Idiom in English language
- Media feeding frenzy
- Phrasal verb
- Metaphor
