= Knowledge falsification =

Deliberate misrepresentation of knowledge

Knowledge falsification is the deliberate misrepresentation of what one knows under perceived social pressures. The term was coined by Timur Kuran in his book Private Truths, Public Lies: The Social Consequences of Preference Falsification.

== Motives ==
According to Kuran's analysis of preference falsification, knowledge falsification is usually undertaken to signal a preference that differs from one's private preference, in other words, to support preference falsification. Successful misrepresentation of one's private preferences requires hiding the knowledge on which they rest. Thus, people engage in preference falsification, or bolster it, by misrepresenting their information, interpretations, and understanding.

Such misrepresentation is a response to perceived social, economic, and political pressures. The perceived pressures could be partly, if not fully, imaginary. The pressures may be rooted in speech controls imposed by a state and enforced through state-enforced punishments. But, as with preference falsification, knowledge falsification need not be a response solely, or even mainly, to pressures from the state or some other organized political entity. The source of pressures is partly individuals seeking to display conformity to an agenda that appears politically popular. In any given context, knowledge falsification may end abruptly, through a self-reinforcing shift in public opinion.

== Social effects ==
Among the effects of knowledge falsification is the distortion, corruption, and impoverishment of knowledge in the public domain. Society is denied exposure to what is believed to be true, and it gets exposed instead to information that its bearers consider false. A further effect is widespread ignorance about policy failures and about the potential advantages of reforms. Knowledge falsification can also bring intellectual narrowness and ossification, harming innovation. Yet another possible consequence is the persistence of policies, customs, norms, fashions, and institutions that are widely disliked.

Knowledge falsification not only misinforms others about social reality, observes Learry Gagné, it also leads to widespread self-deception. Because people systematically underestimate others’ motivations to keep private knowledge out of the public domain, they find it easy to accept beliefs that appear widespread. In reinforcing one another's incentives to falsify knowledge, members of a community also keep one another from gaining awareness of the mechanisms through which they deceive themselves.

Focusing on the inefficiencies of knowledge falsification, Cass Sunstein argues that societies benefit from institutions aimed at minimizing it. He observes: “Knowledge falsification, bred by the natural human inclination to defer to the crowd, can create serious problems for the crowd itself. If members of the crowd are not revealing what they know, errors and even disasters are inevitable.” On that basis, he argues that leaders, legislatures, corporations, schools, and committees should deliberately promote their own exposure to dissenting discourses. Courts work better, he shows, when their decision-making bodies include people who bring to evaluations diverse information and interpretations of facts.

Building on Sunstein's insights, Graham McDonough argues that knowledge falsification can undermine a central aim of moral education: making the personal judgments needed to maintain personal relationships. It can do so by impairing the communication of reasonable differences and, in the process, curtailing epistemological diversity. Airing differences in understandings facilitates the construction of politically, ethically, and epistemically satisfying moral guidelines.

On any given issue, the prevalence of knowledge falsification may vary systematically across demographic groups that differ in endured social, cultural, and political pressures. And, the members of any given demographic group may differ in what knowledge they convey to others, depending on the audience. In this vein, Kuran and Edward McCaffery show that publicly conveyed perceptions of discrimination differ systematically depending on survey mode. On controversial matters of discrimination, Americans appear more willing to reveal pertinent knowledge online than offline.

== Institutions for minimizing knowledge falsification ==
The observations of Kuran and Sunstein echo Friedrich Hayek’s views about the advantages of democracy. “Democracy is, above all, a process of forming opinion,” wrote Hayek, and “it is in its dynamic, rather than its static, aspects that the value of democracy proves itself.” Developing Hayek's claim, Michael Wohlgemuth argues that democratic constitutions limit the scope of both preference falsification and knowledge falsification (he coins the term “opinion falsification” as an aggregate concept that captures both knowledge and preference falsification). Democratic constitutions facilitate, on the one hand, the process of filtering out of public discourses contrived public knowledge and public preferences and, on the other, the discovery of knowledge and preferences that individuals keep private.

An intellectual tradition going back at least to John Stuart Mill holds that meaningful social deliberation requires the freedoms to express thoughts and to pursue knowledge wherever it leads. Building on that tradition, Russell Blackford notes that societies need institutional defenses not only against government efforts to control knowledge but also against conformist pressures that induce knowledge falsification. The latter category of institutions includes norms that enhance the social status of heretics, eccentrics, truth-tellers, artists, and comedians for the enrichment they bring to the pool of public knowledge. The celebration of disseminating controversial knowledge should be limited, Blackford holds, only in cases of dehumanizing hate speech. This exception brings into play multiple widely accepted principles, so it must be handled on a case-by-case basis, but always with attention to maintaining incentives to publicize useful knowledge.

== See also ==
- Common knowledge
- Conformity
- Disinformation
- Epistemic community
- Fake news
- Knowledge
- Lying
- Preference falsification
- Secret ballot
- Signalling theory
- Social desirability bias
- Social proof
- Spiral of silence
