= Preference falsification =

Stating a preference not truly held

Preference falsification is the act of misrepresenting a preference under perceived public pressure. It involves publicly expressing a preference that differs from one's underlying privately held preference (or simply, a public preference at odds with one’s private preference). People frequently convey to each other preferences that differ from what they would communicate privately under credible cover of anonymity (such as in opinion surveys to researchers or pollsters). Techniques such as list experiments can be used to uncover preference falsification.

The term was coined by economist and political scientist Timur Kuran in a 1987 article, "Chameleon voters and public choice." In the article, Kuran argued that widely disliked policies may appear popular when controversial issues induce preference falsification. The distribution of public preferences, which Kuran defines as public opinion, may differ greatly from private opinion, which is the distribution of private preferences known only to individuals themselves.

Kuran developed the implications in a 1995 book, Private Truths, Public Lies: The Social Consequences of Preference Falsification. He argues that preference falsification is not only ubiquitous but has major social and political consequences. He provides a theory of how preference falsification shapes collective illusions, sustains social stability, distorts human knowledge, and conceals political possibilities. Collective illusion is an occurrence when most people in a group go along with an idea or a preference that they don't agree with, because they incorrectly believe that most people in the group agree with it.

== Specific form of lying ==
Preference falsification aims specifically at molding the perceptions others hold about one’s motivations. As such, not all forms of lying entail preference falsification. To withhold bad medical news from a terminally ill person is a charitable lie. But it is not preference falsification, because the motivation is not to conceal a wish.

Preference falsification is not synonymous with self-censorship, which is simply the withholding of information. Whereas self-censorship is a passive act, preference falsification is performative. It entails actions meant to project a contrived preference.

Strategic voting occurs when, in the privacy of an election booth, one votes for candidate B because A, one’s favorite, cannot win. This entails preference manipulation but not preference falsification, which is a response to social pressures. In a private polling booth, there are no social pressures to accommodate and no social reactions to control.

== Private opinion vs. public opinion ==
The term public opinion is commonly used in two senses. The first is the distribution of people’s genuine preferences, often measured through surveys that provide anonymity. The second meaning is the distribution of preferences that people convey in public settings, which is measured through survey techniques that allow the pairing of responses with specific respondents. Kuran distinguishes between the two meanings for analytic clarity, reserving public opinion only for the latter. He uses the term private opinion to describe the distribution of a society’s private preferences, known only to individuals themselves.

On socially controversial issues, preference falsification is often pervasive, and ordinarily public opinion differs from private opinion.

== Private knowledge vs. public knowledge ==
Private preferences over a set of options rest on private knowledge, which consists of the understandings that individuals carry in their own minds. A person who privately favors reforming the educational system does so in the belief that, say, schools are failing students, and a new curriculum would serve them better. But this person need not convey to others his sympathy towards a new curriculum. To avoid alienating powerful political groups, she could pretend to consider the prevailing curriculum optimal. In other words, her public knowledge could be a distorted, if not completely fabricated, version of what she really perceives and understands.

Knowledge falsification causes public knowledge to differ from private knowledge.

== Three main claims of Kuran's theory ==
Private Truths, Public Lies identifies three basic social consequences of preference falsification: distortion of social decisions, distortion of private knowledge, and unanticipated social discontinuities.

=== Distortion of social decisions ===
Among the social consequences of preference falsification is the distortion of social decisions. In misrepresenting public opinion, it corrupts a society’s collective policy choices. One manifestation is collective conservatism, which Kuran defines as the retention of policies that would be rejected in a vote taken by secret ballot and the implicit rejection of alternative policies that, if voted on, would command stable support.

For an illustration, suppose that a vocal minority within this society takes to shaming the supporters of a certain reform. Simply to protect their personal reputations, people privately favoring the reform might start pretending to be satisfied with the status quo. In falsifying their preferences, they would make the perceived share of the reform opponents discourage other reform sympathizers from publicizing their own desires for change. With enough reform sympathizers opting for comfort through preference falsification, a clear majority privately favoring reform could co-exist with an equally clear majority publicly opposing the same reform. In other words, private opinion could support reform even as public opinion opposes it.

A democracy has a built-in mechanism for correcting distortions in public opinion: periodic elections by secret ballot. On issues where preference falsification is rampant, elections allow hidden majorities to make themselves heard and exert influence through the ballot box. The privacy afforded by secret balloting allows voters to cast ballots aligned with their private preferences. As private opinion gets revealed through the ballot box, preference falsifiers may discover, to their delight, that they form a majority. They may infer that they have little to fear from vocalizing honestly what they want. That is the expectation underlying secret balloting.

In practice, however, secret-ballot elections serve their intended corrective function imperfectly. For one thing, on issues that induce rampant preference falsification, elections may offer little choice. All serious contestants will often take the same position, partly to avoid being shamed and partly to position themselves optimally in policy spaces to maximise their appeal to the electorate. For another, in periodic elections citizens of a democracy vote for representatives or political parties that stand for policy packages. They do not vote on individual policies directly. Therefore, the messages that a democratic citizenry conveys through secret balloting are necessarily subject to interpretation. A party opposed to a particular reform may win because of its stands on other issues. Yet, its vote may be interpreted as a rejection of reform.

Nevertheless, periodic secret balloting limits the harms of preference falsification. It keeps public opinion from straying too far from private opinion on matters critical to citizens. By contrast, in nondemocratic political regimes no legal mechanism exists for uncovering hidden sentiments. Therefore, serious distortions of public opinion are correctable only through extra-legal means, such as rioting, a coup, or a revolution.

=== Distortion of private knowledge ===
Private preferences may change through learning. We learn from our personal experiences, and we can think for ourselves. Yet, because our cognitive powers are bounded, we can reflect comprehensively on only a small fraction of the issues on which we decide, or are forced to, express a preference. However much we might want to think independently on every issue, our private knowledge unavoidably rests partly on the public knowledge that enters public discourse—the corpus of suppositions, observations, assertions, arguments, theories, and opinions in the public domain. For example, most people’s private preferences concerning international trade are based, to one degree or another, on the public communications of others, whether through publications, TV, social media, gatherings of friends, or some other medium.

Preference falsification shapes or reshapes private knowledge by distorting the substance of public discourse. The reason is that, to conceal our private preferences successfully, we must control the impressions we convey. Effective control requires careful management of our body language but also of the knowledge that we convey publicly. In other words, credible preference falsification requires engaging in appropriately tailored knowledge falsification as well. To convince an audience that we favor trade quotas, facts and arguments supportive of quotas must accompany our pro-quota public preference.

Knowledge falsification corrupts and impoverishes the knowledge in the public domain, Kuran argues. It exposes others to facts that knowledge falsifiers know to be false. It reinforces the credibility of falsehoods. And it conceals information that the knowledge falsifier considers true.

Preference falsification is thus a source of avoidable misperceptions, even ignorance, about the range of policy options and about their relative merits. This generally harmful effect of preference falsification works largely through the knowledge falsification that accompanies it. The disadvantages of a particular policy, custom, or regime might have been appreciated widely in the past. However, insofar as public discourse excludes criticism of the publicly fashionable options, the objections will tend to be forgotten. Among the mechanisms producing such collective amnesia is population replacement through births and deaths. New generations are exposed not to the unfiltered knowledge in their elders’ heads but, rather, to the reconstructed knowledge that their elders feel safe to communicate. Suppose that an aging generation had disliked a particular institution but refrained from challenging it. Absent experiences that make the young dislike that institution, they will preserve it to avoid social sanctions but also, perhaps mainly, because the impoverishment of public discourse has blinded them to the flaws of the status quo and blunted their capacity to imagine better alternatives. The preference and knowledge falsification of their parents will have left them intellectually handicapped.

Over the long run, then, preference falsification brings intellectual narrowness and ossification. Insofar as it leaves people unequipped to criticize inherited social structures, current preference falsification ceases to be a source of political stability. People support the status quo genuinely, because past preference falsification has removed their inclinations to want something different.

The possibility of such socially induced intellectual incapacitation is highest in contexts where private knowledge is drawn largely from others. It is low, though not nil, on matters where the primary source of private knowledge is personal experience. Two other factors influence the level of ignorance generated by preference falsification. Individuals are more likely to lose touch with alternatives to the status quo if public opinion reaches an equilibrium devoid of dissent than if some dissenters keep publicizing the advantages of change. Likewise, widespread ignorance is more likely in a closed society than in one open to outside influences.

=== Generating surprise ===
If public discourse were the only determinant of private knowledge, a public consensus, once in place, would be immutable. In fact, private knowledge has other determinants as well, and changes in them can make a public consensus unravel. But this unraveling need not occur in tandem with growing private opposition to the status quo. For a while, its effect may simply be to accentuate preference falsification (for the underlying logic, see also works by Mark Granovetter, Thomas Schelling, Chien-Chun Yin, and Jared Rubin). Just as underground stresses can build up for decades without shaking the ground above, so discontents endured silently may make private opinion keep moving against the status quo without altering public opinion. And just as an earthquake can hit suddenly in response to an intrinsically minor tectonic shift, so public opinion may change explosively in response to an event of minor intrinsic significance to personal political incentives. Summarizing Kuran’s logic requires consideration of the incentives and disincentives to express a preference likely to draw adverse reactions from others.

In Kuran’s basic theory, preference falsification imposes a cost on the falsifier in the form of resentment, anger, and humiliation for compromising his individuality. This psychological cost grows with the extent of preference falsification. Accordingly, a citizen will find it harder to feign approval of the established policy if he favors massive reform than if he favors mild reform. In choosing a public preference with respect to the status quo, the individual must also consider the reputational consequences of the preference he conveys to others. If reformists are stigmatized and ostracized, and establishmentarians are rewarded, solely from a reputational standpoint he would find it more advantageous to appear as an establishmentarian. The reputational payoff from any given choice of a public preference depends on the relative shares of society publicly supporting each political option. That is because each camp’s rewarding and punishing is done by their members themselves. The camps thus form pressure groups. All else equal, the larger a pressure group, the greater the pressure it exerts on members of society.

Unless the established policy happens to coincide with an individual’s private ideal, he thus faces a tradeoff between the internal benefits of expressing himself truthfully and the external advantages of being known as an establishmentarian. To any issue, observes Kuran, individuals can bring different wants, different needs for social approval, and different needs to express themselves truthfully. These possibilities imply that people can differ in their responses to prevailing social pressures. Of two reform-minded individuals, one may resist social pressures and express her preference truthfully while the other opts to accommodate the pressures through preference falsification. A further implication is that individuals can differ in terms of the social incentives necessary to make them abandon one public preference for another. The switchover points define individuals’ political thresholds. Political thresholds can vary across individuals for the reasons given above. The framework above has also been extended to allow for the partial masking of private preferences.

We are ready now to explain how, when private opinion and public opinion are far apart, a shock of the right kind can make a critical number of disgruntled individuals reach their thresholds for expressing themselves truthfully to put in motion a public-preference cascade (also known as a public-preference bandwagon, or, when the form of preference is clear from the context, a preference cascade). Until the critical mass is reached, changes in individual dispositions are invisible to outsiders, even to one another. Once it is reached, switches in public preferences impel people with thresholds a bit higher than those of the people within the critical mass add their own voices to the chorus for reform. And support for reform then keeps feeding on itself through growing pro-reform pressure and diminishing pressure favoring the status quo. Each addition to the reformist camp induces further additions until a much larger share of society stands for change. This preference cascade ends when no one is left whose threshold is sufficiently low to be tipped into the reformist camp by one more other individual’s prior switch.

This explosive growth in public support for reform amounts to a political revolution. The revolution will not have been anticipated, because preference falsification had concealed political currents flowing under the visible political landscape. Despite the lack of foresight, the revolution will easily be explained with the benefit of hindsight. Its occurrence lowers the personal risk of publicizing preference falsification in the past. Tales of expressive repression expose the vulnerability of the prerevolutionary social order. Though many of these tales will be completely true, others will be exaggerated, and still others will be outright lies. Indeed, the revolution creates incentives for people who were long satisfied genuinely with the status quo to pretend that, at heart, they were always reformists waiting for a prudent time to speak out.

Good hindsight does not imply good foresight, Kuran insists. To understand why we were fooled in the past does not provide immunity to being surprised by future social discontinuities. Wherever preference falsification exists, an unanticipated social break is possible.

Kuran developed his theory of “unanticipated revolution” in an April 1989 article that gave the French Revolution of 1789, the Russian Revolution of February 1917, and the Iranian Revolution of 1978-79 as examples of earth-shattering events that caught the world by surprise. When the Berlin Wall fell in November 1989, and several East European communist regimes fell in quick succession, he interpreted the surprise through an illustrative form of his theory. Both articles predict that revolutionary political surprises are a fact of political life; no amount of modeling and empirical research will provide full predictability as long as public preferences are interdependent and preference falsification exists. In a 1995 article, he emphasized that his unpredictability prediction is falsifiable. He stated as a proposition: “The ubiquity of preference falsification makes more revolutionary surprises inevitable.” This proposition “can be debunked,” he wrote, “by constructing a theory that predicts future revolutions accurately,” illustrating through examples that the predictions would need to specify the timing.

== Case studies ==
Kuran’s Private Truths, Public Lies contains three case studies. They involve the trajectory of East European communism, India’s caste system, and racial inequality and related policies in the United States. Many other scholars have applied the concept of preference falsification in myriad contexts. Some prominent cases are summarized here, and additional cases are referenced.

=== Communism’s persistence and sudden fall ===
==== Persistence of communism ====
For many decades, the communist regimes of the Eastern Europe, all established during or after World War II as “people’s democracies,” drew public support from millions of dissatisfied citizens. The reason is only partly that authorities punished dissenters. Citizens seeking to prove their loyalty to communism participated in the vilification of nonconformists, even of dissidents whose political positions they privately admired. This insincerity made it highly imprudent to oppose communism publicly. As such, it contributed to the survival of generally despised communist regimes. Vocal dissenters existed. They included Alexander Solzhenitsyn, Andrei Sakharov, and Václav Havel. But East European dissidents were far outnumbered by unhappy citizens who opted to appear supportive of the incumbent regime. By and large, dissidents were people with an enormous capacity for enduring social stigma, harassment, and even imprisonment. In terms of the Kuran model, they had uncommonly low thresholds for speaking their minds. Most East Europeans had much higher thresholds. Accordingly, for all the hardships of life under communism, they remained politically submissive for years on end.

==== Ideological influence ====
One can privately despise a regime without loss of belief in the principles it stands for. By and large, people who came to disdain communist regimes continued, for decades, to believe in its viability. Most attributed its shortcomings to corrupt leaders, remaining sympathetic to communism itself.

Kuran attributes communism’s ideological influence partly to preference falsification on the part of people who felt victimized by it. In concealing their grievances to avoid being punished as an “enemy of the people,” victims had to refrain from communicating their observations about communism’s failures; they also had to pay lip service to Marxist principles. Their knowledge falsification distorted public discourse enormously, sowing confusion about the shortcomings of communism. Not even outspoken dissidents came out unscathed. Until Mikhail Gorbachev’s reforms of the 1980s broke longstanding taboos, most East European dissidents remained committed to some form of socialism.

Well before the fall of communism, during the heyday of Soviet power and apparent invincibility, the dissident Alexander Solzhenitsyn pointed to this phenomenon of intellectual enfeeblement. He said that the Soviet people had become “mental cripples.”

The Hungarian economist János Kornai struggled in the 1960s to the 1980s to reform the Hungarian economy. His history of reform communism characterizes the reformers of the 1950s and 1960s (including himself) as naive. It was ridiculous, he wrote in 1986, to think that the Soviet command system could be reformed in such a way to ensure efficiency, growth, and equality all at once.

Diverse reformers helped expose communism’s unviability. But the biases of socialist public discourse handicapped even them. Their own thinking was warped by the distortions of communist public discourse.

==== The sudden fall of East European communism ====
The collapse of several communist regimes in 1989 surprised many powerful individuals and institutions, including scholars, statesmen, futurologists, the CIA, the KGB, other intelligence organizations, dissidents with great insight into their societies (such as Havel and Solzhenitsyn), and even Gorbachev, whose actions unintentionally laid the groundwork for this transformation.

A major trigger was the Soviet Union’s twin policies of perestroika (restructuring) and glasnost (openness). Perestroika amounted to an acknowledgment, by the Soviet Communist Party that something was seriously wrong, that the Communist system was not about to overtake the West. Glasnost allowed Soviet citizens to participate in debates about the system, to propose changes, to speak the previously unspeakable, to admit that they had been thinking what had been considered unthinkable. Public discourse broadened, heightening disillusionment with communism and intensifying popular discontent. In the process, millions of East European citizens became increasingly willing to support an opposition movement publicly.

Few would step forward, though, so long as the opposition movement remained minuscule. Hence, no one, not even the East Europeans themselves, knew how ready Eastern Europe had become for regime changes.

In retrospect, a turning point was Gorbachev’s trip to Berlin on October 7, 1989 for celebrations marking the 40th anniversary of East Germany’s communist regime. Crowds fill the streets, chanting “Gorby! Gorby!” The East German police responded with restraint. TV scenes of the demonstrations and the police response signaled, on the one hand, that discontent was very broad and, on the other hand, that the regime was vulnerable. The result was an explosive growth in public opposition, with each demonstration sparking larger demonstrations. The fall of the Berlin Wall came on November 9. Regimes considered unshakeable crumbled, in quick succession, under the weight of open opposition from the streets.

As public opposition grew, East Europeans relatively satisfied with the status quo jumped on the public-preference cascade to secure a place in the emerging new order. In line with Kuran’s theory of unanticipated revolutions, information now points to the existence of significant hidden opposition to the region’s parties.

The data that have surfaced include classified opinion surveys found in Communist Party archives. Like rulers of dictatorial regimes throughout history, Party leaders understood that their support partly feigned. For self-preservation, they conducted anonymous opinion surveys whose results were treated as state secrets. The once-classified data show little variation until 1985. They indicate substantial belief in the efficiency of socialist institutions, but also far more doubt than public discourse suggested. After 1985, faith in communism plummeted and the perception that communism is unworkable spread.

A puzzle is why the East European leaders who had access to this information, and who thus knew that disillusionment with communism was growing, did not block the rise in explosive opposition. They probably could have prevented the cascades that were to unfold through massive force early on. Certain communist leaders thought that reforms would ultimately reverse the process. Others did not realize how quickly private discontent could produce self-reinforcing public opposition.

At the very end, fear simply changed sides: party functionaries who had helped foster repression came to fear ending up on the wrong side of history. In retrospect, it appears that their reticence to respond forcefully at the outset enabled public oppositions to grow explosively in country after country, through a domino effect. Each successful revolution lowered the perceived risks of joining the opposition in other countries.

=== Religious preference falsification ===
Preference falsification has played a role in the growth and survival of religions. It has contributed also to the shaping of religious institutions and beliefs. Some case studies are summarized here.

==== India’s caste system ====
For several millennia, Indian society has been divided into ranked occupational units, or castes, whose membership is determined primarily by descent. In practice, the caste system became an integral part of Hinduism in most parts of the Indian subcontinent. Over the ages, this system survived anti-Hindu movements, foreign invasions, colonization, even the challenges of aggressive conversions from Islam and Christianity. Although discrimination against the lower castes became illegal in post-colonial India, caste remains a powerful force in Indian life. Most marriages take place between members of the same caste.

===== Persistence of caste system =====
The extraordinary durability of the caste system has puzzled social scientists, especially because, in most times and places, the system has perpetuated itself with little use of force. A related enigma has been the support given to the system by groups at the foot of the Hindu social hierarchy, namely the Untouchables (Dalits). Because of their deprivations, the Untouchables might be expected to have resisted the caste system en masse.

George Akerlof offers an explanation that hinges on two observations: (1) castes are economically interdependent, and (2) traditional Indian society penalizes people who neglect or refuse to abide by caste codes. For example, if a firm hires an Untouchable to fill a post traditionally reserved for an upper caste, the firm loses customers, and the hired Untouchable endures social punishments. Because of these conditions, no individual can break away from the caste system unilaterally. To succeed, he must break away as part of a coalition. But free riding blocks the formation of viable coalitions. Because the rule breaker would suffer negative consequences immediately and without any guarantee of success, no firm and no Untouchable initiates a break.

In Private Truths, Public Lies, Kuran observes that Indians were penalised not just for actions against the caste system but also for expressions of opposition. The caste system discouraged inquiries into its rationale. It also discouraged open criticism of caste rules. By and large, the reservations of Indians remained suppressed. Preference falsification with respect to the system was common, as was knowledge falsification. Based on these findings and focusing on processes that shape public opinion and public knowledge, Kuran extends Akerlof's theory.

Reticence to publicize preferences and knowledge honestly kept Indians in the dark, Kuran argues, about opportunities for forming anti-caste coalitions. It made them perceive the caste system as inescapable, even in contexts where, collectively, they had the power to change, even overthrow, the system. Hence, before the 1800s, negotiations for a more egalitarian social contract did not get off the ground. Reform-minded Indians could not find each other, let alone initiate discussions leading to reforms.

===== Caste ideology =====
The caste system was legitimized through a tenet of Hinduism, the doctrine of karma. According to this doctrine, an individual’s behavior in one life affects his social status in his later lives. If a person accepts his caste of birth and fulfils the tasks accepted of him without making a fuss, he gets reincarnated into a higher caste. If instead he neglects the duties of the caste into which he was born or challenges the caste system, he gets demoted in his next life. Accordingly, the karma doctrine treats prevailing status differences as the fair and merited consequences of past conduct.

Many ethnographies find that, to close friends, low-ranked Indians will confess doubts about karma, if not outright lack of belief in it. But preference and knowledge falsification by Indians, even by substantial numbers, does not imply that the doctrine is merely a façade. Over countless generations, many Indians internalized the doctrine of karma. Belief in social mobility through reincarnation has been common; so has belief in ritual impurity, which Hinduism treats as both a source and a manifestation of social inferiority.

These concepts emerged so long ago that their origins are poorly understood. It is clear, though, that, once the caste system got established, the highest-status castes, the brahmins, had incentives to perpetuate the caste system by punishing Indians who misbehaved or expressed disapproval. As Kuran explains, preference and knowledge falsification made some Indians obey the system for fear of reprisals and others out of conviction. In either case, public discourse facilitated the acceptance of karma-based status differences. Most Indians remained ignorant of concepts critical to treating their conditions as unacceptable. Insofar as Indians genuinely believed in caste ideology, the caste system strengthened.

In the 19th century, the caste system came to be questioned widely in public. The key trigger was that growing numbers of Indians became acquainted with egalitarian European movements, such as democratisation, liberalism, and socialism. The ensuing Indian reform movement led, in the second half of the 20th century, to a system of caste-based education and job quotas meant to assist the most disadvantaged groups within Indian society, including the Untouchables.

==== Shii Islam’s taqiyya doctrine ====
After Islam’s Sunni-Shii schism in 661 CE, Sunni leaders took to persecuting Shiis living in their domains. Their campaign to extinguish Shiism included requiring suspected Shiis to insult the founders of Shiism. Refusal to comply could result in imprisonment, torture, even death. In response, Shii leaders adopted a doctrine that allowed individual Shiis to conceal their Shii beliefs in the face of danger, provided they met two criteria. First, the preference falsifiers would stay devoted, in their hearts, to Shii tenets; and second, they would intend, as soon as the danger passed, to return to practicing Shiism openly. This form of religious preference falsification was known as taqiyya.

Shii leaders gave taqiyya religious legitimacy through Quran verses that speak of God’s omniscience; God saw, on the one hand, people’s private and public preferences, and, on the other hand, the conditions making religious preference falsification a matter of survival. He would sympathize with taqiyya exercised for legitimate reasons by people who, at least privately, retained the correct faith.

Gradually, the taqiyya doctrine turned into a justification for Shii political passivity. Stretching the meaning of this doctrine, many Shiis living under an oppressive regime used it to rationalize inaction, even apathy. In the 20th century, growing numbers of Shii leaders took to telling their followers that taqiyya had been a key source of Shii political and economic weakness. The mastermind of Iran’s Revolution of 1979, Ayatollah Ruhollah Khomeini, opened his campaign to topple the Pahlavi Monarchy by proclaiming: “The time for taqiyya is over. Now is the time for us to stand up and proclaim the things we believe in.” The success of Khomeini’s campaign involved millions of Iranians joining street protests against the Pahlavi regime, at the risk of being caught, if not killed on the spot, by the regime’s widely feared security forces.

Once it consolidated power, Iran’s Islamic Republic founded by Khomeini’s team did not institute religious freedoms. In forcing Iranians to live according to its specific interpretation of Shiism, it effectively induced a new form of taqiyya. Having the regime’s morality police enforce a conservative dress code for women (hijab) resulted in rampant religious preference falsification of a new kind. Against their will, millions of Iranian women started covering their hair and abiding by the regime’s modesty standards in myriad ways, simply to avoid punishment. Evidence lies in the commonness of mini headscarves that cover just enough hair to pass as veiled. These headscarves are known pejoratively as “bad hijab” or “slutty hijab.” They represent attempts by Iranian women to minimize the extent of their religious preference falsification.

==== Crypto-Protestantism in France, 1685-1787 ====
Between the Edict of Nantes (1598) and the Edict of Fontainebleau (1685), Protestantism enjoyed toleration in France. The latter edict inaugurated a period when Protestantism was officially proscribed, except in Alsace and Lorraine. Many French Protestants emigrated to Switzerland, Great Britain, British North America, Prussia, and other predominantly Protestant territories. At least officially, the Protestants who stayed behind converted to Roman Catholicism. Of these converts, some practiced Catholicism in public even as they performed Protestant rites privately. Such crypto-Protestantism is a form of religious preference falsification.

During the Revocation period, appearing as a Catholic was a matter of survival. But the required public performances varied across groups and by location, as did crypto-Protestant practices. For example, the Jaucourt family, a noble crypto-Protestant house, discreetly fulfilled its religious commitments at the Protestant chapels of Scandinavian embassies. Catholic authorities, both state officials and Catholic clergy, looked the other way.

For most of the crypto-Protestant population, however, the medium for performing Protestant rites was Désert Church. This was a clandestine network of congregations that operated throughout France with the help of lay crypto-Protestants and Reformed Protestant clerics. Initially, these clerics were domestically trained. Eventually, they were all foreign-trained.

Public performance of Catholic rites gave crypto-Protestants access to civil status deeds as well as official registrations of births, baptisms, and marriages. These incentives for religious preference falsification were not trivial. For example, legal marriage gave offspring legitimacy and inheritance rights. Désert marriages had no legal standing.

French Protestants regained the right to legal marriage as Protestants 102 years after the Edict of Fontainebleau, with the Edict of Tolerance (1787).

==== Covert Judaism and Islam during the Portuguese Inquisition ====
In 1496, King Manuel I of Portugal decreed the expulsion of Jews and free Moors from his kingdom and dominions, unless they converted to Christianity. Four decades later, during the reign of John III, Portugal’s Holy Office of the Inquisition was established. It began to persecute people accused of crypto-Judaism, crypto-Islam, or some other form of religious preference falsification.

The Portuguese Inquisition functioned as a persecutory organization against covert practices of other religions, but also against heresies and deviations from sexual mores considered un-Christian, such as bigamy and sodomy. The Inquisition pursued these missions until at least the 1770s, when the government of the Marquis of Pombal repurposed this institution. The Portuguese Inquisition was terminated in 1821.

Iberian-Jewish (Sephardic) converts to Catholicism and their descendants were all known as “New Christians.” The Islamic converts and their descendants were known collectively as Mouriscos. On pain of social rejection and inquisitorial persecution, they were required to display, convincingly enough, their adherence to Roman Catholicism.

Blood purity statutes regulated access to Portugal’s public posts and honorific distinctions (also called limpeza de sangue), denying a broad range of privileges to New Christians on account of their heredity. But they could move upward by a combination of marrying “Old Christians” and having records of their roots altered. Diverse entities, including the Inquisition, were used to help New Christians whitewash their heritage through “blood purity” certificates, invariably in return for fees. This whitewashing process involved knowledge falsification by both sides.

The credibility of blood purity certificates depended on the issuing entity’s place in Portugal’s hierarchy. Accordingly, New Christians could keep rising in social status through blood purity certificates of increasing rigor. More rigorous certificates could be obtained from higher-level investigations also to confront rumors of impure ancestry. Many Portuguese families with New Christian roots progressed upwards in social status by creating availability cascades of positive blood purity certifications. Such families bolstered the availability of information pointing to blood purity also by placing relatives in the Roman Catholic clergy. These placements served themselves as certifications, for the clergy was closed to Christians of "impure" ancestry (namely Jewish, Moorish, and Sub-Saharan African).

=== Gender norms ===
According to a 2020 study, by Leonardo Bursztyn, Alessandra González, and David Yanagizawa-Drott, the vast majority of young married men in Saudi Arabia express private beliefs in support of women working outside the home. At the same time, they substantially underestimate the degree to which other similar men support it. Once they become informed about the widespread nature of the support, they increasingly help their wives obtain jobs.

=== Ethnic conflict ===
In "Ethnic norms and their transformation through reputational cascades," Kuran applies the concept of preference falsification to ethnic conflict. The article focuses on ethnification, the process whereby ethnic origins, ethnic symbols, and ethnic ties gain salience and practical significance.

Ethnicity often serves as a source of identity without preventing cooperation, exchanges, socializing and intermarriage across ethnic boundaries. In such contexts, social forces may preserve that condition indefinitely. People who harbor ill-will toward other ethnic groups will keep their hatreds in check to avoid being punished for divisiveness. But if political and economic shocks weaken those forces, a process of ethnification may get under way. Specifically, people may start highlighting their ethnic particularities and discriminating against ethnic others. The emerging social pressures will then generate further ethnification through a self-reinforcing process, possibly leading to spiraling ethnic conflict.

An implication of Kuran's analysis is that culturally, politically, economically, and demographically similar countries may exhibit very different levels of ethnic activity. Another is that ethnically based hatreds may constitute by-products of ethnification rather than their mainspring.

==== Yugoslav Civil War ====
Kuran uses the above argument to illuminate how the former Yugoslavia, once touted as the model of a civilized multiethnic nation, became ethnically segregated over a short period and dissolved into ethnically based enclaves at war with one another. Preference falsification increased the intensity of the Yugoslav Civil War, he suggests; also, it accelerated Yugoslavia’s break-up into ethnically based independent republics.

== See also ==
- Abilene paradox – False consensus due to communication failure
- Cognitive bias – Systematic pattern of deviation from norm or rationality in judgment
- Crypto-fascism – Hidden support for fascist ideology
- Collapse of Communism – Revolutionary wave overthrowing most communist states in Europe
- False consensus – Attributional type of cognitive bias
- Honne and tatemae – Japanese concept of true feelings vs. public behavior
- Iranian Revolution – Revolution in Iran from 1978 to 1979
- Knowledge falsification – Deliberate misrepresentation of knowledge
- Lie – Intentionally false statement made to deceive
- Manufacturing Consent – 1988 book by Edward S. Herman and Noam Chomsky
- Overton window – Range of ideas tolerated in public discourse
- Pluralistic ignorance – Incorrect perception of others' beliefs
- Revolution – Rapid and fundamental political change
- Russian Revolution – 1917–1922 civil war in the Russian Empire
- Secret ballot – Anonymous voting method
- Shy Tory factor – Phenomenon observed in opinion polling
- Signalling theory – Theory in evolutionary biology
- Social desirability bias – Response bias exhibited by survey respondents
- Social proof – Psychological phenomenon regarding conformity
- Spiral of silence – Political science and mass communication theory
- Virtue signalling – Pejorative term
