= Bait ball =

Defense mechanism used by small schooling fish

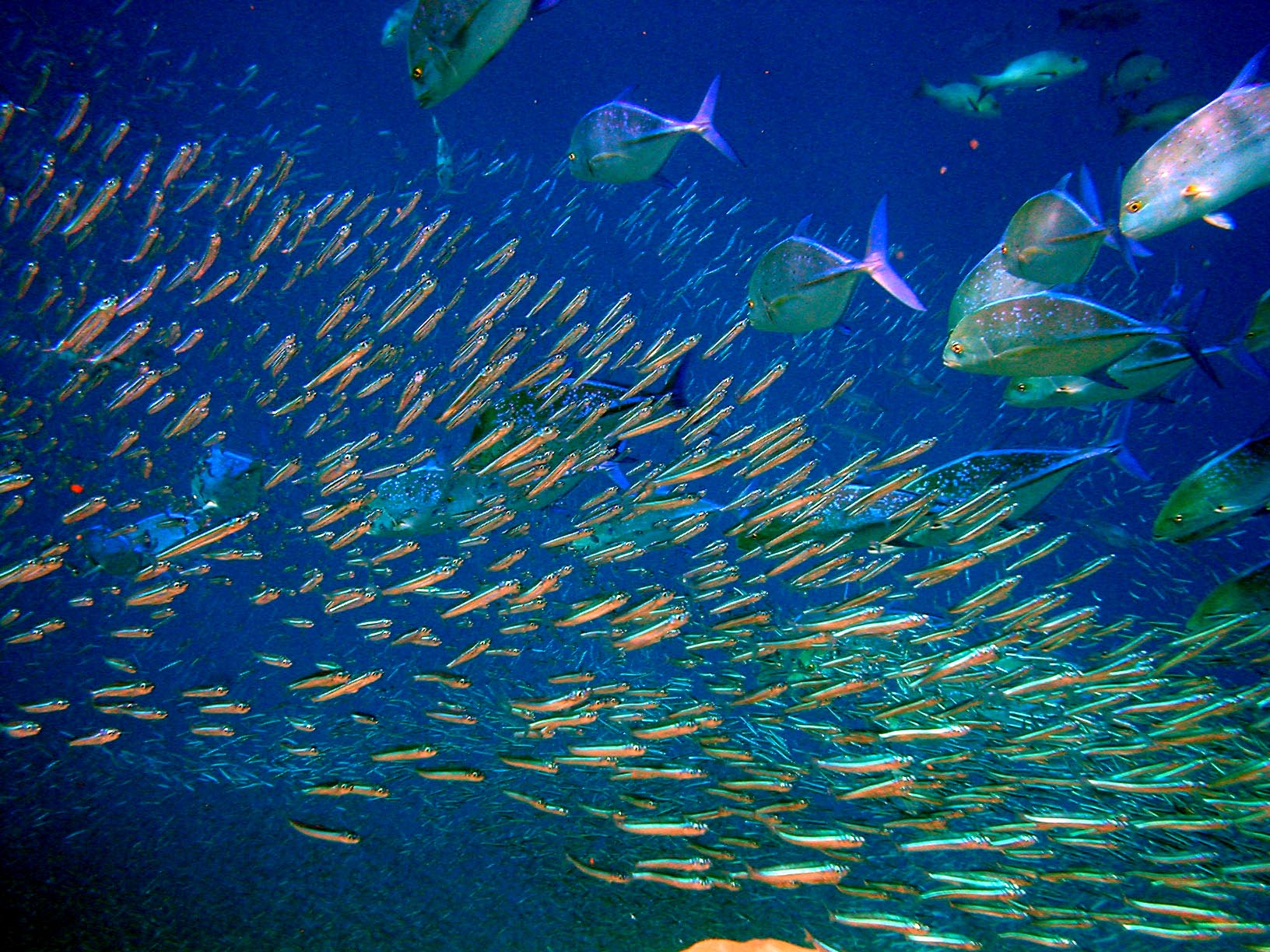
A school of bluefin trevally working a school of anchovies which may compact into a spherical bait ball if they are sufficiently threatened

A bait ball, or baitball, occurs when small fish swarm in a tightly packed spherical formation about a common centre. It is a last-ditch defensive measure adopted by small schooling fish when they are threatened by predators. Small schooling fish are eaten by many types of predators, and for this reason they are called bait fish or forage fish.

For example, sardines group together when they are threatened. This instinctual behaviour is a defence mechanism, as lone individuals are more likely to be eaten than an individual in a large group. Sardine bait balls can be 10–20 metres (33–66 ft) in diameter and extend to a depth of 10 metres (33 ft). The bait balls are short-lived and seldom last longer than 10 minutes.

However, bait balls are also conspicuous, and when schooling fish form a bait ball, they can draw the attention of many other predators. As a response to the defensive capabilities of schooling fish, some predators have developed sophisticated countermeasures. These countermeasures can be spectacularly successful, and can seriously undermine the defensive value of forming bait balls.

== Background ==
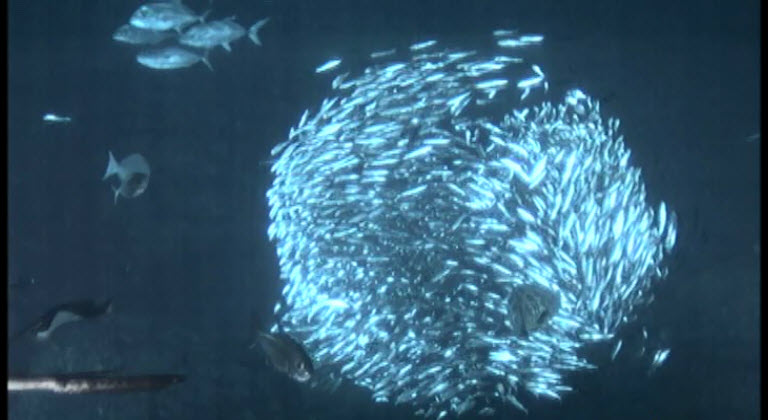
Sardine bait ball

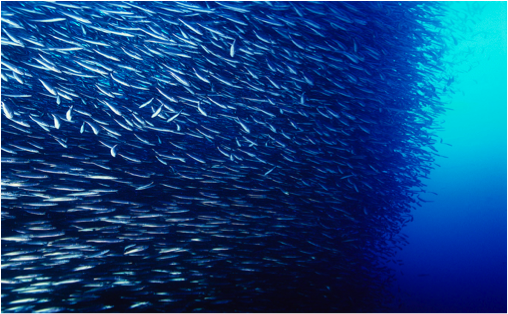
Edge of a large baitball

Small pelagic fish live in the open water, so unlike demersal or reef fish, they cannot hide among kelp, or in crevices in coral, or under rocks on the bottom. This leaves them vulnerable to attack by large predatory fish, as well as other predators, such as marine mammals and seabirds. As a result, small pelagic fish usually aggregate in schools for protection. Schooling fish have evolved sophisticated evasion techniques. When they school, they have many eyes, making ambush difficult; and their silvery bodies dazzle, making it difficult for predators to pick out individual fish. They react to movements from a predator with lightning reflexes, rhythmically streaming up and down with rapid direction changes. When a predator approaches, they can split and reform behind the predator. During the final stages of an attack, they can explosively disband in all directions and then just as rapidly reform. Defensive manoeuvres like these appear to be choreographed, though they are not. Within the school itself, there is no centralized intelligence aware of how the school has configured itself. Rather, the schooling behaviour is the emergent consequence of relatively simple rules followed by each individual fish in the school, such as remaining close together, moving in the same direction, and avoiding collisions with each other.

Some species of forage fish, driven by nutrient availability and their life-cycle stage, form vast schools at predictable locations and times of the year. Normally, schooling works well as protection from occasional predators. Fish schooling in vast numbers may attract correspondingly huge numbers of predators, including seabirds, sharks, tuna, billfish, pods of dolphins, and killer and humpback whales. Aggregations of predators on such a scale means the schools can be attacked on all sides and panicked into forming bait balls.

A bait ball is a last-ditch defensive measure adopted by fish schools when they are overwhelmed and more effective defensive strategies have broken down. Schooling fish are easier to attack once they abandon their free streaming behaviour and form into a tight bait ball. Many predator species have learned that by interacting cooperatively they can panic schooling fish into forming a bait ball. This cooperative behaviour can occur both intraspecifically (among the individuals within a predator species) and interspecifically (across individuals belonging to more than one predator species).

== Formation and dissolution ==
The process that leads to the formation of a bait ball typically starts when predators locate a fish school deep below the surface. The predators make rushes and use various scare tactics to force the fish school to the surface, herding it at the same time into a compact volume. The alarmed fish, trapped against the surface above and surrounded all about, abandon their coordinated schooling movements and become chaotic. Their graceful and disciplined schooling strategies of uniform spacing and polarity degrade into frenetic attempts by each fish to save itself. In this way, a dense bait ball forms as each fish scrambles to get away from the surface of the ball and hide in the interior. The symmetry of this centripetal action forms a sphere, the shape with the minimum surface area for a given volume, thereby exposing the fewest fish on the surface to the predators. The movement, sound and smell can attract more predators, including different predator species than those already present, until there is a carousel of them, each species using its own characteristic predatory strategies. Fish that break loose are singled out and eaten. A frenzy can develop as predators compete. As the bait ball reduces in size and number, it becomes progressively easier for the predators to target the survivors.

== Predator strategies ==
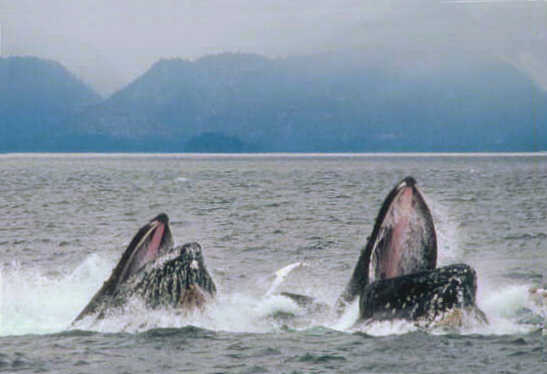
Pair of humpback whales lunge feeding

Predators have devised various countermeasures to disrupt the defensive shoaling and schooling manoeuvres of forage fish. Often this involves charging the school or bait ball at high speed.

Some whales lunge feed on bait balls. Lunge feeding is an extreme feeding method in which the whale accelerates from below a bait ball to a high velocity and then opens its mouth to a large gape angle. This action generates the water pressure required to expand its mouth and engulf and filter a huge amount of water and fish. Lunge feeding by rorquals, a family of huge baleen whales that includes the blue whale, is said to be the largest biomechanical event on Earth.

Swordfish charge at high speeds through forage fish schools, slashing with their swords to kill or stun prey. They then turn and return to consume their catch. Thresher sharks use their long tails to stun shoaling fishes. Spinner sharks charge vertically through schools, spinning on their axis with their mouths open and snapping all around. The shark's momentum at the end of these spiralling runs often carries it into the air.

Gannets plummet from heights of 30 metres (100 feet), plunging through the water and leaving vapour-like trails behind like fighter planes. They enter the water at speeds up to 86 kilometres per hour (53 mph) and descend to depths of 34 metres (111 feet). Under the skin in their faces and chests, gannets have air sacs which act like bubble-wrap, cushioning the impact with water.

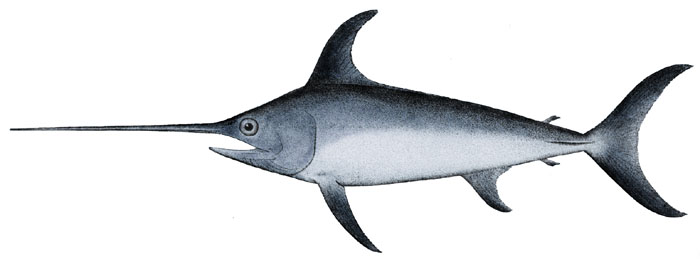
Swordfish slash with their swords.

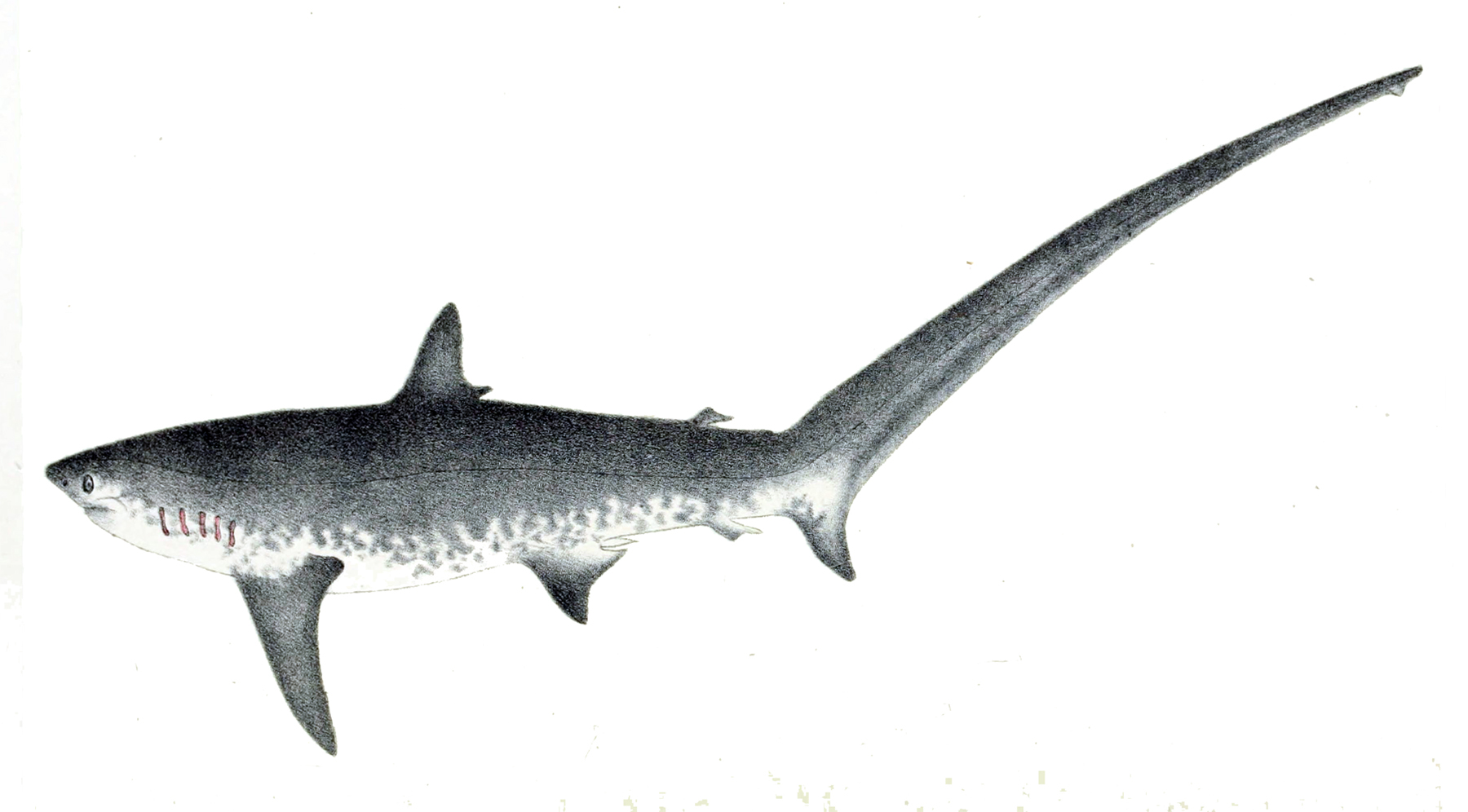
Thresher sharks strike with their tails.

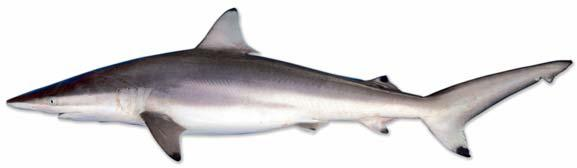
Spinner sharks spin on their axis.

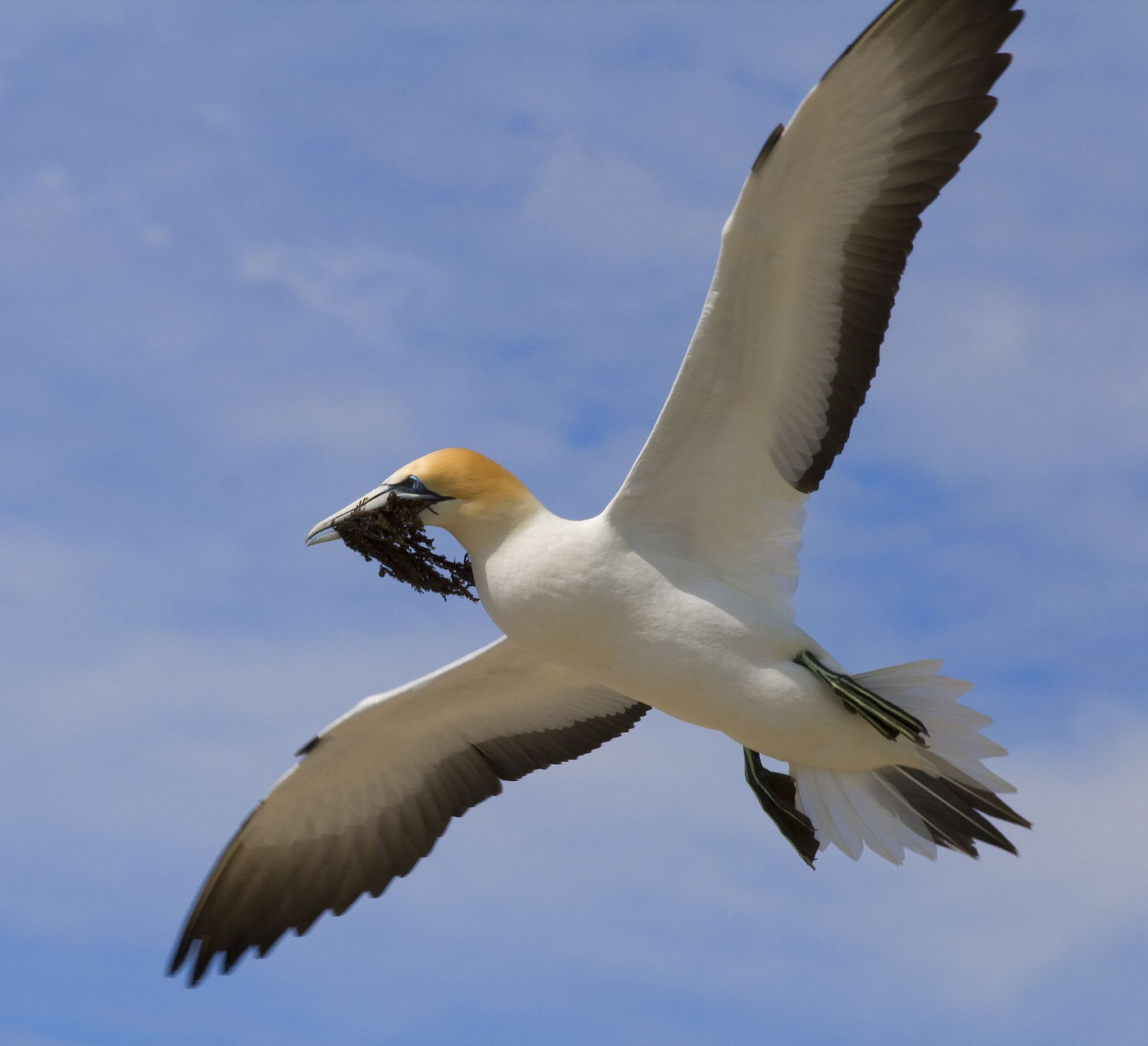
Gannets "divebomb" at high speed.

== Predator cooperation ==
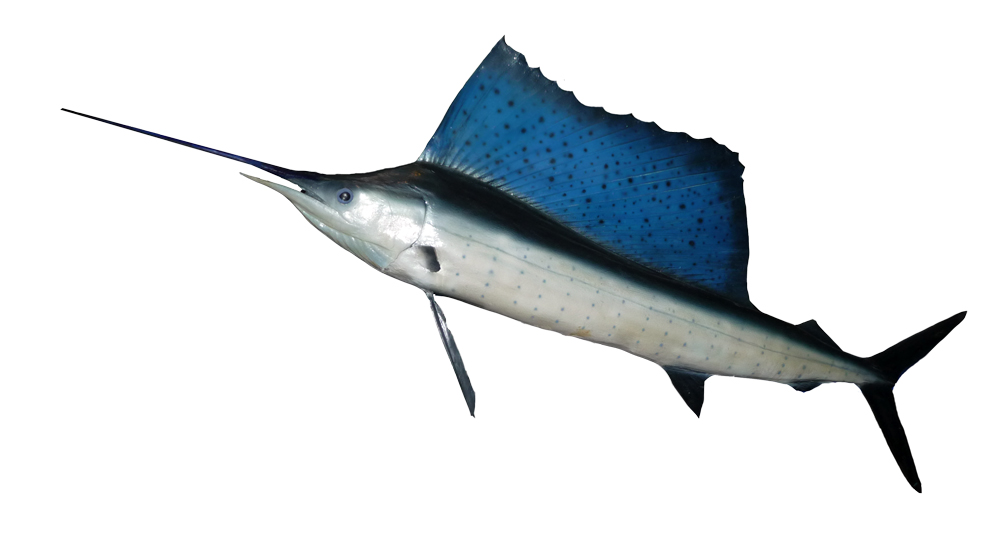
Sailfish work together, raising their sails to make them appear much larger so they can "herd" a school of fish or squid.

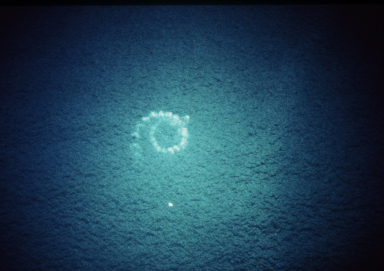
Aerial view of a bubble net

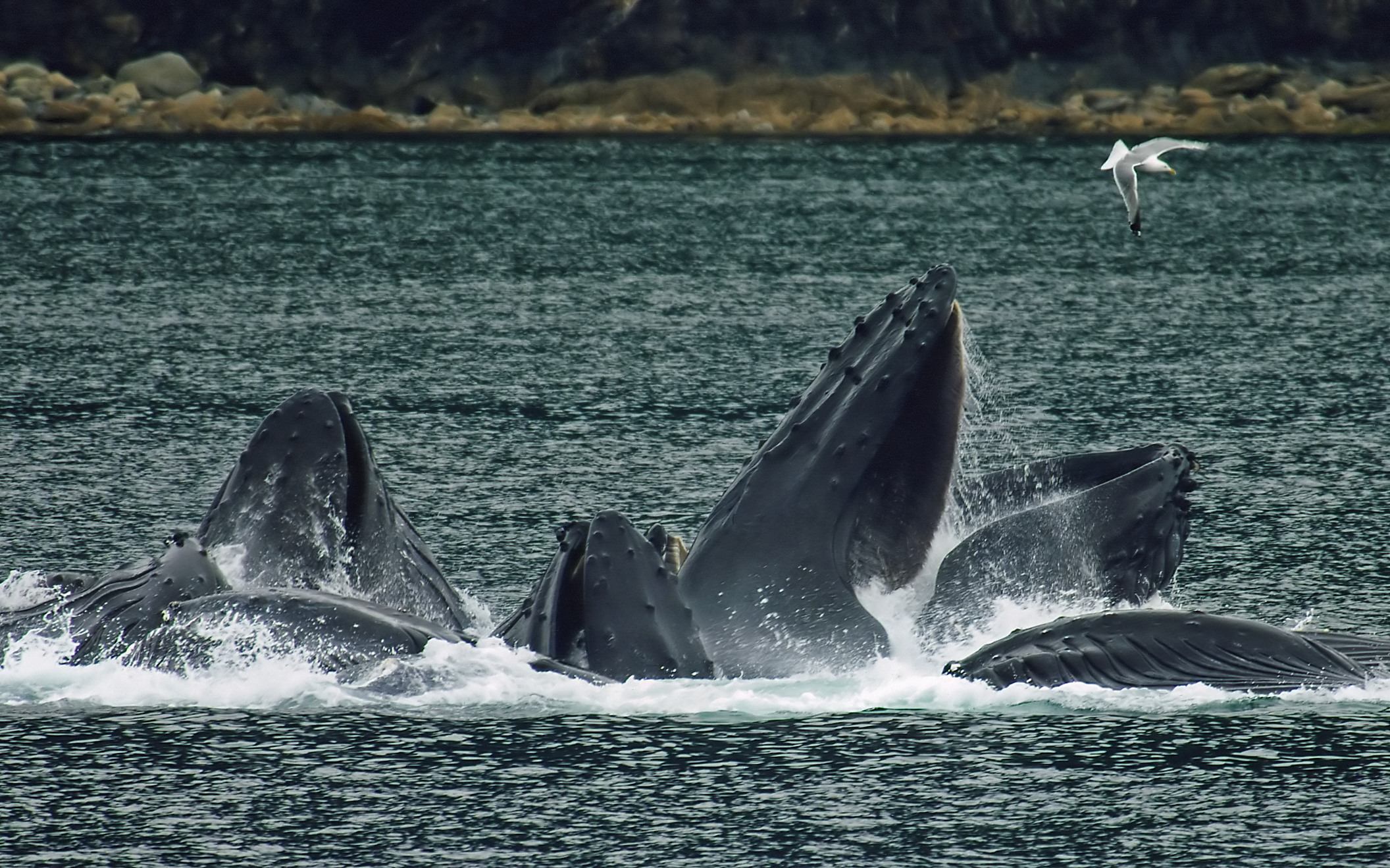
Group of humpback whales lunging through the centre of their bubble net

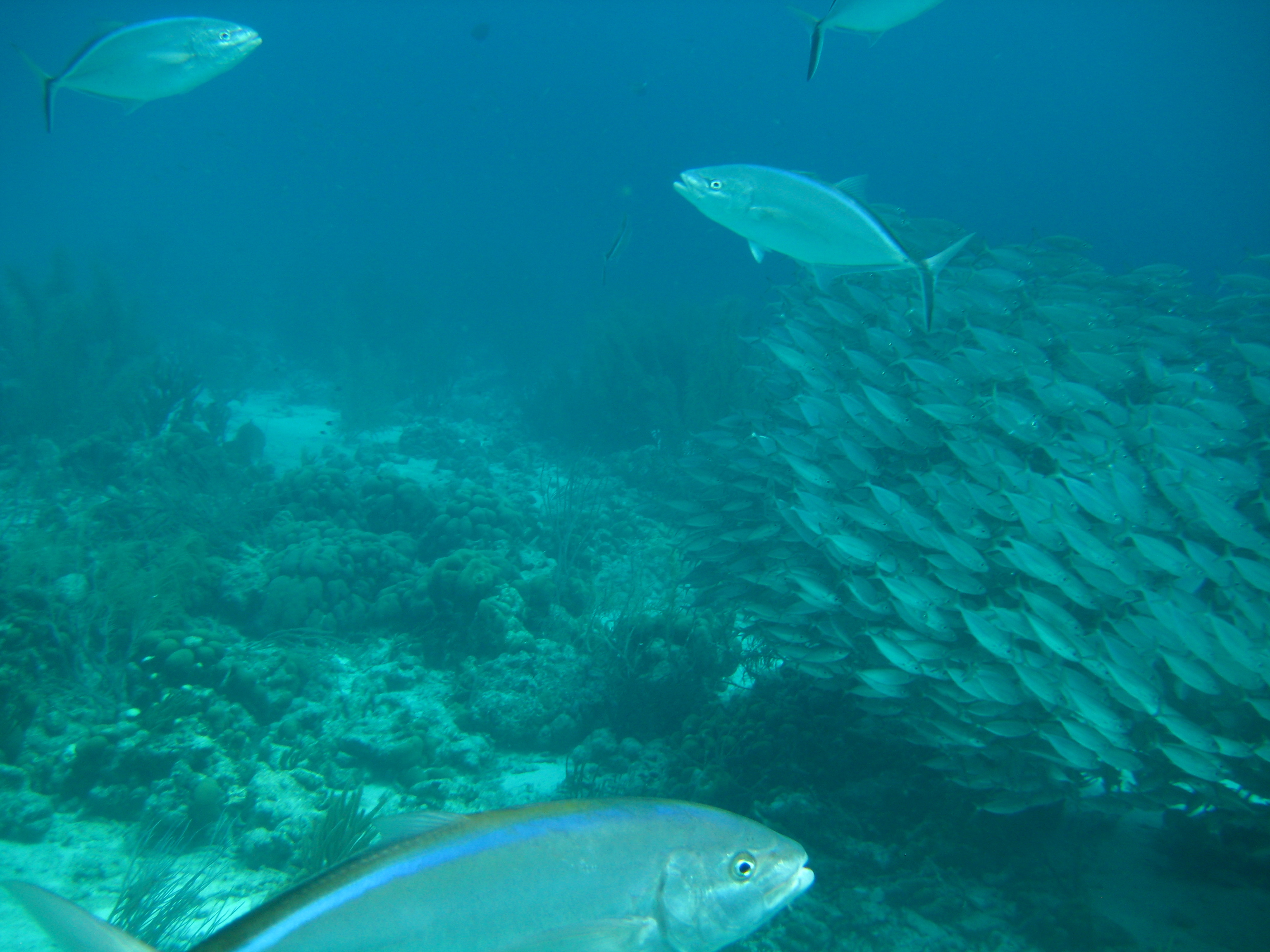
Bar jacks working a small bait ball

The most effective strategy predators use against schooling fish is first to scare them into forming a bait ball. Strategies such as those outlined in the previous section can work to a degree against freely streaming fish schools, but work much better if the fish school is first compacted into a bait ball. It is difficult for predators working individually to scare a fish school into a bait ball, and they usually work together.

- Thresher sharks compact their prey by swimming in circles around them, splashing the water with their long tails, often in pairs or small groups. They then strike sharply at the bait ball to stun the fish with the upper lobe of their tails.
- Schools of forage fish can draw silky sharks in large numbers. Silky sharks have been documented "herding" such schools into a bait ball trapped against the surface, and then consuming the entire school. When attacking tightly packed fish, silky sharks charge through the ball and slash open-mouthed, catching the prey fish at the corners of their jaws. Although multiple individuals may feed at once, each launches its attack independently.
- Pods of many dolphin species commonly herd a school of fish into a bait ball while individual members take turns ploughing through and feeding on the more compacted shoal. Corralling is a method where fish are chased to shallow water where they are more easily captured. Some dolphins take this further with strand feeding, driving prey until they are stranded on mud banks, where they can be easily accessed. Dolphins have also been observed blowing bubbles to startle and separate individual fish from a bait ball.
- The humpback whale uses a feeding technique called bubble-net feeding. A group of whales swim in a shrinking circle, blowing bubbles below a school of prey fish. Forage fish show a strong fear of bubbles and can be easily contained within a bubble curtain. The shrinking ring of bubbles encircles the school and confines it in an ever smaller cylinder. The whales then lunge feed, often as a synchronised group, suddenly swimming upward through the "net", mouths agape, swallowing thousands of fish in one gulp. The ring can begin at up to 30 metres (100 ft) in diameter with perhaps a dozen whales cooperating. The use of a crittercam attached to a whale's back has revealed that some whales blow the bubbles while others dive deeper to drive fish toward the surface, and yet others herd the prey into the net by vocalizing. Some humpback whales also scare schooling fish by slapping their tails (lobtailing). Although many whale species lunge feed, only humpbacks use bubble nets.
- Killer whales usually hunt larger fish, such as salmon, individually or in small group of individuals. However, forage fish, such as herrings, are often caught using carousel feeding. The killer whales force the herrings into a tight ball by releasing bursts of bubbles or flashing their white undersides. They then slap the ball with their tail flukes, either stunning or killing up to 10–15 herring with a successful slap. The herring are then eaten one at a time. Carousel feeding has been documented in only the Norwegian killer whale population and with some oceanic dolphin species.

== Mixed species feeding ==
External images
- Bait ball symphony
- Cooperative hunting by sailfish
- Bronze whalers charge a baitball

Fish that school in large numbers can draw the attentions of many different predator species. The attraction of huge numbers of prey fish means that these predator species, which might otherwise be mutually antagonistic, usually cooperate with each other in pursuit of their common goal.

Bryde's whales often track dolphin groups as they herd prey species. As soon as the dolphins corral the prey, the whales lunge feed through the centre.

In 2001, Clua and Grosvalet proposed a four stage model to describe mixed species feeding behaviour involving common dolphins, tuna and shearwater sea birds.

- In the preparation phase, the dolphins rapidly circle the fish school to compact it.
- In the intensification phase, the bait ball is further structured by dolphins circling and foraging the periphery of the ball, while shearwaters forage from the ocean surface.
- At the mature phase, the dolphins temporarily scatter as giant tuna lunge vertically through the centre of the ball. At this point the concentration of the bait ball is optimal.
- Finally in the dispersion phase, the tuna and sea birds disperse, and some dolphins return to forage on the remnants of the ball.

External videos
- Fish bait ball in open water Blue Planet, BBC
- Bait Ball Feast The Great Feast, BBC
- Bluefin tuna eat bait ball National Geographic
- Shearwater attack! – Blue Planet BBC Wildlife
- Amazing bait balls & predatory fishermen BBC
- Marlin feeding on sardine ball YouTube
- Marlin & Tuna Feeding Blue Planet: Open Seas

Most years, off southern Africa between May and July, billions of sardines (specifically the Southern African pilchard Sardinops sagax) spawn in the cool waters of the Agulhas Bank and move northward along the east coast of South Africa. This great fish migration is called the sardine run. Their sheer numbers create a feeding frenzy along the coastline. The run, containing millions of individual sardines, occurs when a current of cold water heads north from the Agulhas Bank up to Mozambique where it then leaves the coastline and goes further east into the Indian Ocean. During the sardine run, as many as 18,000 dolphins, behaving like sheepdogs, herd the sardines into bait balls, or corral them in shallow water. Once rounded up, the dolphins and other predators take turns ploughing through the bait balls, gorging on the fish as they sweep through. Seabirds also attack them from above, flocks of gannets, cormorants, terns and gulls. The sardine run is featured in the first episode of the 2001 BBC nature documentary The Blue Planet and in the 2008 3D IMAX documentary film Wild Ocean.

A similar great migration of herrings occurs each year during the summer plankton bloom along the coast of British Columbia and Alaska. The migration is featured in the final episode of the 2009 BBC wildlife documentary Nature's Great Events. In winter, the coastal fjords and inlets are relatively lifeless, and the resident Steller sea lions must dive deeper and further from the coast to catch the widely-dispersed herring. Humpback whales overwinter in the warm Pacific waters off Hawaii, where new mothers suckle their calves. They begin their 3,000-mile (4,800 km) journey north in early spring, when the sea lions also give birth to their young. Spring storms disturb nutrients in the water which, together with the strengthening power of the sun, act as the catalysts for the plankton bloom. Huge shoals of herring arrive to spawn, turning the shallows milky white. The herring sift plankton from the water. In their wake come larger predators, including Pacific white-sided dolphins and killer whales. Common murres dive under the herring shoals and pick off the fish from below, pinning them to the surface. Their defence is to form a bait ball, but gulls gathering on the surface attack them from above. The finale to the programme features unique underwater footage of humpbacks engulfing whole bait balls, and reveals their co-operative hunting behaviour called bubble-netting.

== See also ==
- Feeding frenzy
