= Carousel feeding =

Cooperative hunting method used by some cetaceans

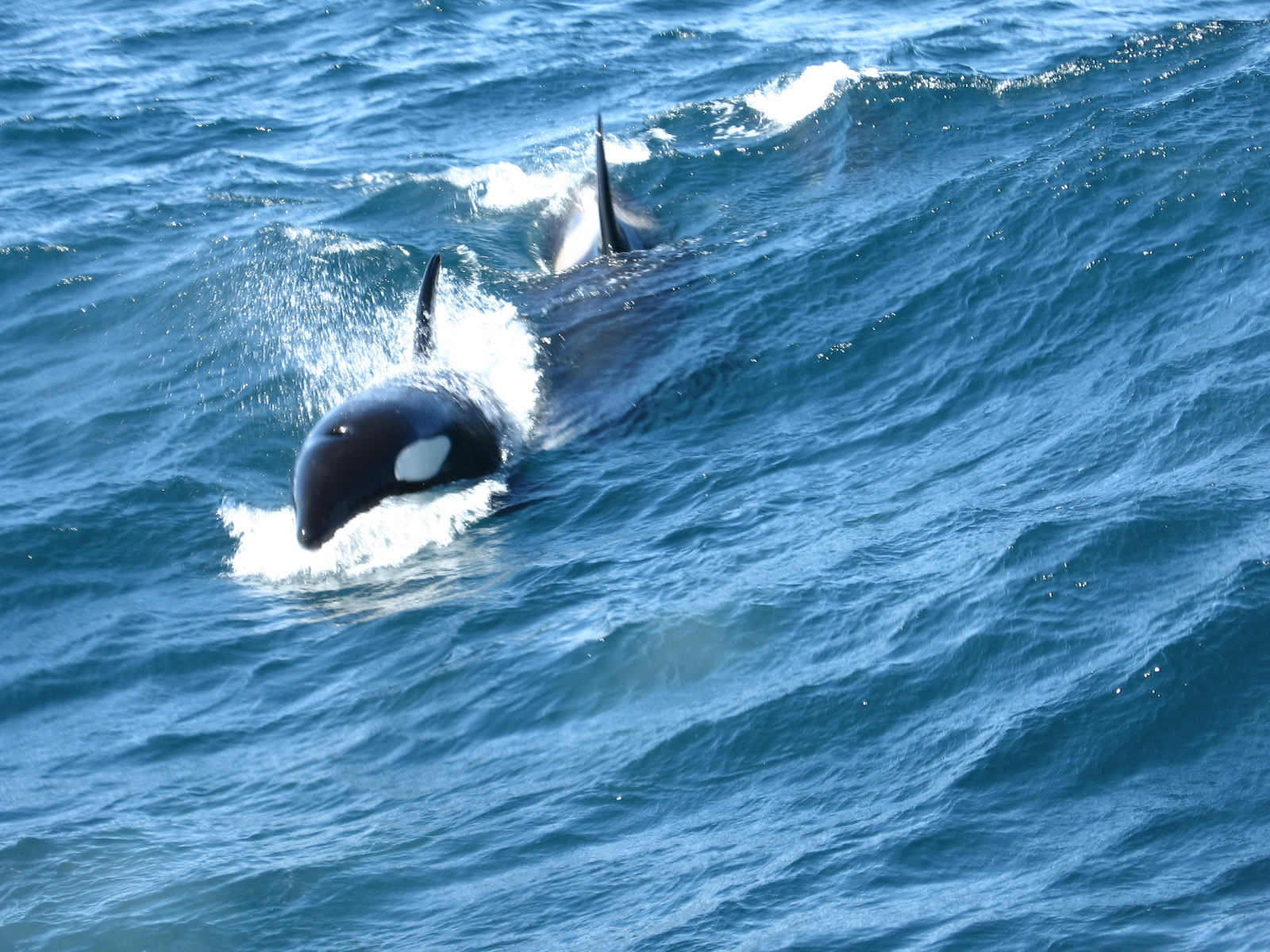

Carousel feeding is a cooperative hunting method used by Norwegian orcas (Orcinus orca) to capture wintering Norwegian spring-spawning herring (Clupea harengus). The term carousel feeding was first used to describe a similar hunting behaviour in bottlenose dolphins (Turslops truncatus) in the Black Sea. There are two main phases of carousel feeding in orcas, the herding phase and the feeding phase. In the herding phase the orcas surround a school of herring and herd them into a tight ball. They tighten the ball by blowing bubbles, flashing their white underside and slapping their tails on the surface. They move the ball of herring toward the surface of the water before initiating the feeding phase. During the feeding phase several orcas begin to eat while the others continue herding the fish to maintain the ball. The feeding orcas whip their tails into the ball to stun and kill several herring at a time. The dead and stunned herring are then consumed and their heads and spines discarded.

== Herding ==
school of herring

Carousel feeding begins when an orca pod locates a school of herring. This is primarily done by echolocation. Orcas can detect herring at a much greater distance than the herring can detect the predator. This gives the orcas an advantage over the herring. The matriarch orca leads the pod (group of 3–9 orcas) in splitting the herring school into a smaller more manageable group. The orcas then circle the herring forcing them into a ball shape. The diameter of the tight ball can range anywhere between two and seven meters. During this period the orcas are highly vocal including clicks and whistling. While tightening the herring ball the orcas push their prey towards the surface of the water. It has been speculated that surface feeding is beneficial because the animals do not have to deep dive so energy is saved, and since the pressure is less intense each tail strike is more effective. In addition, the light conditions are better so the orcas can be more accurate, and the sea surface provides a barrier for the prey. During the herding process herring can be seen jumping at the sea surface. The final stages of herding include blowing bubbles to tighten the ball, flashing the orca's white underbelly to blind and disorient the herring, and slapping the sea surface with their tails. Once the herring are tightly compacted into a conical or elliptical shape near the surface the feeding stage begins.

== Feeding ==
The second stage of carousel is when the orcas get to consume their prey. A portion of the pod feeds while the rest continues herding; after a while the roles switch so all the orcas in the pod get a chance to feed. There are always more orcas herding than there are feeding to ensure the herring ball stays tight. The feeding orcas whip their tails into the herring to stun and kill them. The stunning is a result of the loud noise and physical contact of the tail and the fish. In addition, the fish are debilitated by the pressure change and turbulence which makes it easy for the orcas to catch them. The orcas consume the stunned and dead herring and spit out the heads and spines. The orcas can catch and kill up to 15 herring with each successful slap. Once the orcas are satisfied they release the remaining herring. A carousel feeding event can last from ten minutes to three hours depending on the herring available and the number of orcas in the pod, as well as environmental conditions.

== Ecological impacts ==
=== Orcas ===
Cooperative feeding is a strategy common to social carnivores like orcas. Some of the strategies orcas employ include producing large waves to knock seals off ice floes, or even beaching themselves to catch sea lions. The strategies orcas develop depend on their typical prey type and the most efficient method to capture them considering environmental conditions. Norwegian orcas have developed carousel feeding because it is an effective method to capture spring-spawning herring.

Carousel feeding teaches young individuals important hunting skills. This gives the orcas an evolutionary advantage that helps them ensure the survival of their young. In a K-selected species like orcas parental investment in offspring is very important. This includes teaching the offspring skills to improve their chances of survival. Young orcas learn prey-specific hunting techniques by both imitation of conspecifics and social learning. The amount of parental involvement in learning a hunting behaviour depends on how risky it is. Since carousel feeding is not very risky for young orcas they can participate as soon as they are able. For hunting behaviours that involve sharks or beaching themselves the young orcas are slowly introduced.

The abundance of orcas in a particular area is related to the distribution of spring-spawn herring. Norwegian orcas are most commonly seen in the waters near northern Norway in the fall. This coincides with the wintering of spring-spawning herring. Cod and saithe are also common in the area but studies examining the stomach contents of Norwegian killer whales show the primary biomass consumed is from herring. This is likely due to herring being the most abundant at this time. In the summer many Norwegian orca pods move to the coast of the Lofoten and Vesterålen islands where adolescent herring, mackerel and saithe are more abundant. In addition, whales return to the same regions each season where herring are abundant. Since herring are the Norwegian orca's main food source it is clearly adaptive to have produced a cooperative feeding method specific to the predation of this species.

=== Herring ===
Herring are an important food source for Norwegian orcas; therefore, their distributions influence each other. Herring influence the distribution of orcas and orcas can have a large impact on the population of herring. The herring population is not completely depleted by orcas because they never eat the whole herring ball during the feeding phase of carousel feeding. The herring that are not consumed are able to escape from the orcas. This means the orcas do not completely deplete their food source and potentially the strongest herring will survive the event.

Herrings also have certain adaptive behaviours to protect themselves against predation. The schooling behaviour of herring is largely the reason that many can survive these predation events. Herring are known to form very dense schools when swimming in the more dangerous open ocean, and smaller, less dense schools when closer to the shore where there is less risk of predation. Their ability to change behaviour depending on the situation allows more herring to survive the attack. The selective pressure just one orca pod can put on herrings in the area can emphasize anti-predator behaviours over feeding or mating behaviours. Another example of anti-predator behaviour is the release of gas bubbles from the herring. Orcas force the herring up from large depths, which causes the herring to release gas bubbles in an attempt to disorient predators visually and acoustically.

Carousel feeding can provide food for other species as well as orcas. For example, during a feeding event when the herring have been pushed to the surface of the water, seabirds are often seen feeding on the herring from above. In addition, stunned herring that are left behind by the orcas can be consumed by other fish.
