= Media feeding frenzy =

Heightened media coverage of a story

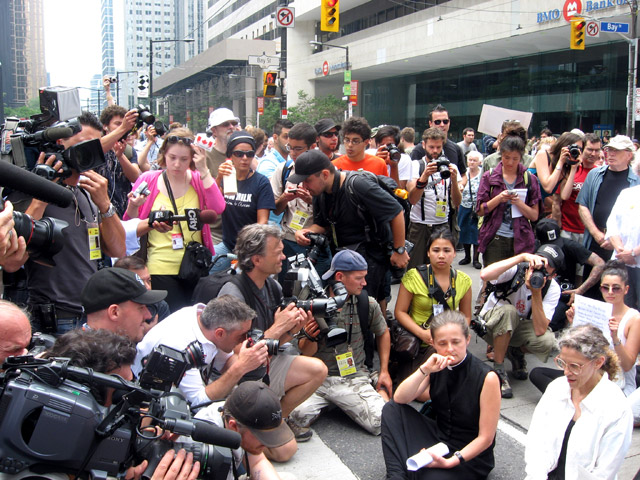
Media circus around St. James protestors

A media feeding frenzy is intense media coverage of a story of great interest to the public. The 1998 Clinton–Lewinsky scandal in the U.S. was a well-noted example of this. The metaphor, drawing an analogy with feeding frenzies among groups of animals, was popularized by Larry Sabato's book Feeding Frenzy: Attack Journalism and American Politics. Other examples include media coverage of "crime waves", which often drive changes in criminal law to address problems that do not appear in the National Crime Victimization Survey (NCVS), the most reliable indicator of actual crime in the U.S.; unlike the Uniform Crime Reports (UCR), the NCVS is not affected by changes in people's willingness to report crimes to law enforcement or in the willingness of law enforcement to forward UCRs to the Federal Bureau of Investigation (FBI) for inclusion in national summaries.

Sacco claimed that media outlets try to organize their reporting as much as possible around themes to help them amortize the work required to educate a journalist to the point where they can discuss a subject intelligently over several reports. These themes become "feeding frenzies". The availability cascade helps explain the human psychology behind a media feeding frenzy. A commercial media organization could lose advertising if they had a media feeding frenzy that affected an advertiser's business: Advertisers don't want to bite the mouths that feed them, and have been known to modify where they spend their advertising budget accordingly. Commercial media disseminate negative information about advertisers only to the extent required to keep customers.

== See also ==
- Media circus
- Missing white woman syndrome
