= Common knowledge =

Statement widely known to be true

Common knowledge is knowledge that is publicly known by everyone or nearly everyone, usually with reference to the community in which the knowledge is referenced. Common knowledge can be about a broad range of subjects, such as science, literature, history, or entertainment. Since individuals often have different knowledge bases, common knowledge can vary and it may sometimes take large-scale studies to know for certain what is common knowledge amongst large groups of people. Often, common knowledge does not need to be cited. Common knowledge is distinct from general knowledge.

In broader terms, common knowledge is used to refer to information that an agent would accept as valid, such as information that multiple users may know. Assigning something the label of common knowledge requires certain considerations about the involved community, group, society and/or individuals, the time period, and the location.

== Variation ==
Defining something as common knowledge can differ based on circumstances because there are variations in what is considered common knowledge amongst different groups. The variation can come from the time period, culture, population, class, age, demographic, and other circumstances. For example, the Fifth Amendment to the United States Constitution might be considered common knowledge among people residing in the United States of a certain age, but cannot be considered common knowledge when considering the general population of other countries.

=== Instability ===
Common knowledge is not always stable, and can shift over time to create new common knowledge. Knowledge that was once considered common knowledge amongst a group, society, or community might later become known as false. For example, for centuries it was common knowledge in Europe that the Sun revolved around the Earth, but after years of arguments, it is now common knowledge that the Earth revolves around the Sun.

=== Large scale ===
On a larger global scale, it is not possible to define almost any knowledge as common knowledge because it is difficult to know how far a fact has spread in global populations without large-scale global population studies. For example, the current president of the United States might be considered common knowledge in much of the world because of the power associated with that position, but one cannot assume that there is global recognition of this fact as common knowledge without further research into the knowledge of global populations.

=== Common belief ===
It is hard to distinguish fact from belief and thus there are scholars who prefer to separate common knowledge from common belief. Common belief is something that is more easily defined because the requirement is only that a majority of people within a specific group, community, or society believe something to be true whereas common knowledge must meet this requirement and also prove that the belief is a fact.

=== Examples ===
- "Paris is the capital of France." Many capital cities of developed countries are considered common knowledge by most people, but one cannot claim this as common knowledge for global populations without further research.
- "It is dangerous to mix ammonia and bleach." Though both common household chemicals, accidents involving the mixing of ammonia and bleach are rare, because the potentially lethal danger in their chemical reaction is a widely circulated cautionary tale amongst some American families and so could possibly be considered common knowledge in those populations, but may not extend to wider populations.

== Other settings ==
Many techniques have been developed in response to the question of distinguishing truth from fact in matters that have become "common knowledge". Techniques for how to shape common knowledge can vary through professional settings.

=== Legal ===
In legal settings, rules of evidence generally exclude hearsay, which may draw on "facts" someone believes to be "common knowledge". The use of common knowledge in law varies between countries.

== See also ==
- Common sense
- Commonsense knowledge
- Consensus reality
- Conventional wisdom
- Factoid
- Knowledge falsification
- List of common misconceptions
