= Media coverage of the Virginia Tech shooting =

Coverage of the 2007 mass shooting

On April 16, 2007, media from around the world descended on Blacksburg, Virginia, upon receiving word of the Virginia Tech shooting.

Reports included US evening news anchors Katie Couric, Brian Williams, and Charles Gibson. Additionally, all network morning shows and the late-night ABC show Nightline sent reporters to the Virginia Tech campus for live coverage.

In addition to the extensive, worldwide media coverage of the event, there was intense speculation immediately following the massacre over the state of mind of the perpetrator. The focus was not only on the perpetrator and the incident, but also on the media itself, with journalistic ethics being questioned. The media and the general public also questioned American gun control policies as a result of the killings.

== United States ==
=== Citizen journalism ===
On April 16, 2007, Jamal Albarghouti (البرغوثي), a graduate student at Virginia Tech, recorded a video of the exterior of Norris Hall during the classroom shootings. Albarghouti captured the footage using the video function on his cell phone while ducking for safety outside the building where the shooting occurred. The video displays police officers reacting to the sound of gunshots, which could be heard coming from the interior of the campus building. His video footage was televised frequently during the course of the event, and additionally logged over 1.8 million hits the day of the incident on CNN's I-Report, a feature that allows viewers to send video footage as well as photos from their cellphone or personal cameras. Albarghouti's video was some of the most memorable media coverage of the event, notably for its audio capture of the shooter's methodic gunfire.

Albarghouti was later interviewed on CNN's Situation Room and appeared on Larry King Live later that day. He said to Larry King that he left the dangerous streets of the Middle East to come to a safe town, Blacksburg, in Virginia to study. He went on to say that he still considers the town to be safe.

The cellphone used by Albarghouti is now headed to the Newseum in Washington D.C., a museum dedicated to the history of Journalism.

=== Inaccurate media reports ===
Early media reports by Michael Sneed of the Chicago Sun-Times incorrectly identified a Chinese American and a Chinese national as the suspected shooter. Her report was cited by different media sources around the world. The erroneous reports spread for more than 12 hours until the perpetrator was officially identified. The Chinese Foreign Ministry issued a statement criticising "irresponsible reports", and saying that it was a "terrible mistake and a violation of professional ethics to publish reports before checking the facts."

Wayne Chiang, a Fall 2006 graduate of Virginia Tech and an ardent supporter of the right to bear arms, was widely mistaken as the killer, as his profile matched several key attributes of the suspected shooter falsely reported by the Chicago Sun-Times. After receiving a deluge of hate-mail and death threats, he came out declaring he was not the shooter.

In a Fox News interview conducted several hours after the shooting occurred and before the killer was identified, controversial (and now disbarred) lawyer Jack Thompson, referred to by Fox News as a "School Shootings Expert," stated that the shootings were motivated by violent video games, specifically the perpetrator's use of them. There were claims that Cho was a devoted player of Counter-Strike, but further investigation revealed little to no proof of his alleged gaming activities.

=== Television news ===
==== Major Networks ====
The CBS Evening News with Katie Couric expanded to an hour that night, and NBC replaced two planned sitcom reruns with a one-hour special at 10 p.m. ET. (The sitcoms were to have replaced The Black Donnellys, which NBC had cancelled.) ABC's World News with Charles Gibson was extended by five minutes, and NBC limited commercials on NBC Nightly News with Brian Williams.

=== Cho's media package ===
The Courier-Mail, Brisbane, Australia from April 20, 2008 Newspapers around the world showed Cho's images

On April 18, NBC aired the videotape and some pictures that it received from the killer, Seung-Hui Cho, that afternoon. The package, which Williams called a "multimedia manifesto," was mailed between the two shooting episodes and was received at NBC's New York headquarters that afternoon, and they reported the package to the FBI. Anticipating criticisms that the airing of the tapes was irresponsible, NBC News president Steve Capus said that reporting the story and distributing the information was a journalistic necessity, to provide context and background on Cho's possible motivations.

Some family members of the victims were upset that the photos and video sent by the killer were broadcast, and subsequently canceled interviews with NBC in protest. A Virginia State Police spokesman said he was "rather disappointed in the editorial decision to broadcast these disturbing images," adding that he regretted that "[people who] are not used to seeing that type of image had to see it."

The American Psychiatric Association, however, urged the media to withdraw the footage from circulation, arguing that publicizing it "seriously jeopardizes the public's safety by potentially inciting 'copycat' suicides, homicides and other incidents." NBC defended itself by stating its staff had intensely debated releasing the footage before deciding to broadcast it and asserted it had covered this story with extreme sensitivity. Williams also emphasized that it had edited out a large amount of obscene material and that the release was cleared by federal and state authorities.

At the annual meeting of NBC's parent company, General Electric, Media watchdog group Accuracy in Media sought the firing of NBC News President Steve Capus because of his decision to air the tapes.

== Outside the U.S. ==
There was extensive coverage of the Virginia Tech shooting and its aftermath in countries throughout the world, with many stations and papers sending journalists to Blacksburg to cover the massacre. Dozens of newspapers around the world placed the story on the front page.

In the UK, an editorial in The Times asked, "Why ... do Americans continue to tolerate gun laws and a culture that seems to condemn thousands of innocents to death every year, when presumably, tougher restrictions, such as those in force in European countries, could at least reduce the number?" An article on the front-page of the Ottawa Citizen, advocating tougher gun control laws, similarly asked why America tolerated laws which "allowed thousands of innocents to be killed each year." The Swedish paper Göteborgs-Posten commented that "without access to weapons, the killings at Virginia Tech might have been prevented" because "the fundamental reason is often the perpetrator's psychological problems in combination with access to weapons." In Japan, the Asahi Shimbun commented that "the mass shooting.... reminded us once again how disturbingly common gun fatalities are in the United States," and went on to note, "Humans become enraged and desperate, and a gun in the hands of an enraged or desperate individual could be a sure recipe of disaster or tragedy." Australian Prime Minister John Howard said tough Australian legislation introduced after a 1996 mass shooting in Tasmania had prevented a problematic gun culture in Australia by showing "a national resolve that the gun culture that is such a negative in the United States would never become a negative in our country."

Other international commentators predicted little chance of tougher gun laws or changes to the U.S. gun culture. BBC's Washington correspondent Matt Frei wrote "America is at its most impressive when it grieves and remembers. But will the soul-searching ever produce legislation and will it make schools safer?". He further predicted that "[d]espite this week's bloodbath there will be no overwhelming demand for gun control in this country." Similarly, The Economist said: "The Columbine killings of 1999 failed to provoke any shift in Americans' attitudes to guns. There is no reason to believe that this massacre, or the next one, will do so either."

The first book published about the killings was La masacre de Virginia Tech: Anatomía de una mente torturada (The Virginia Tech Massacre: Anatomy of a tortured mind, ISBN 978-84-935789-4-7) by the Spanish journalist and author Juan Gómez-Jurado.

== Reaction on campus ==
Students quickly grew tired of the large media presence on campus. The student government issued a statement on Sunday, April 22, the day before classes resumed, asking the media to leave campus. Students were also encouraged to decline requests for contact by the media.

Media criticism of Virginia Tech President Charles Steger was quickly met by support of Steger by alumni, students and faculty. An online petition gathered 32,000 signatures with days and Steger was swarmed by supportive students as he walked the campus. On the whole, those close to university felt that in retrospect, that while the incident could have been handled differently, blaming Steger and Virginia Tech Police Chief Wendell Flinchum was unfair.

== Impact in entertainment ==
- The massacre was mentioned three times in the April 17 episode of hit show American Idol: First, show host Ryan Seacrest expressed "thoughts and prayers" on behalf of the producers of the show and the network; contestant Chris Richardson from Chesapeake, Virginia dedicated his performance to the victims and their families; judge Simon Cowell noted "how difficult this week was for all of us." Cowell was caught rolling his eyes on camera as a contestant was expressing sympathy for Tech victims. At first, this was misinterpreted as his showing his disrespect. Cowell later clarified that he was discussing the contestant's performance with another judge.
- Another Fox show, Bones, postponed the showing of an episode that had been scheduled for April 18. Its storyline centered on a basketball player found dead on a college campus. The episode later aired the following year.
- Also from Fox, The Simpsons episode "You Kent Always Say What You Want" was originally planned to be titled the "Kent State Massacre" but was changed in light of the incident.
- CBS pulled the Criminal Minds episode "Doubt" from the 2006–2007 line-up due to similarities in the plot and the massacre at Virginia Tech in April, 2007. The episode eventually aired September 26, 2007.
- ABC revised the story arc of a 17-episode soap opera One Life to Live in which the May sweeps was to be centered on a hostage crisis taking place at the fictitious Llanview High School.
