= Timur Kuran =

American economist

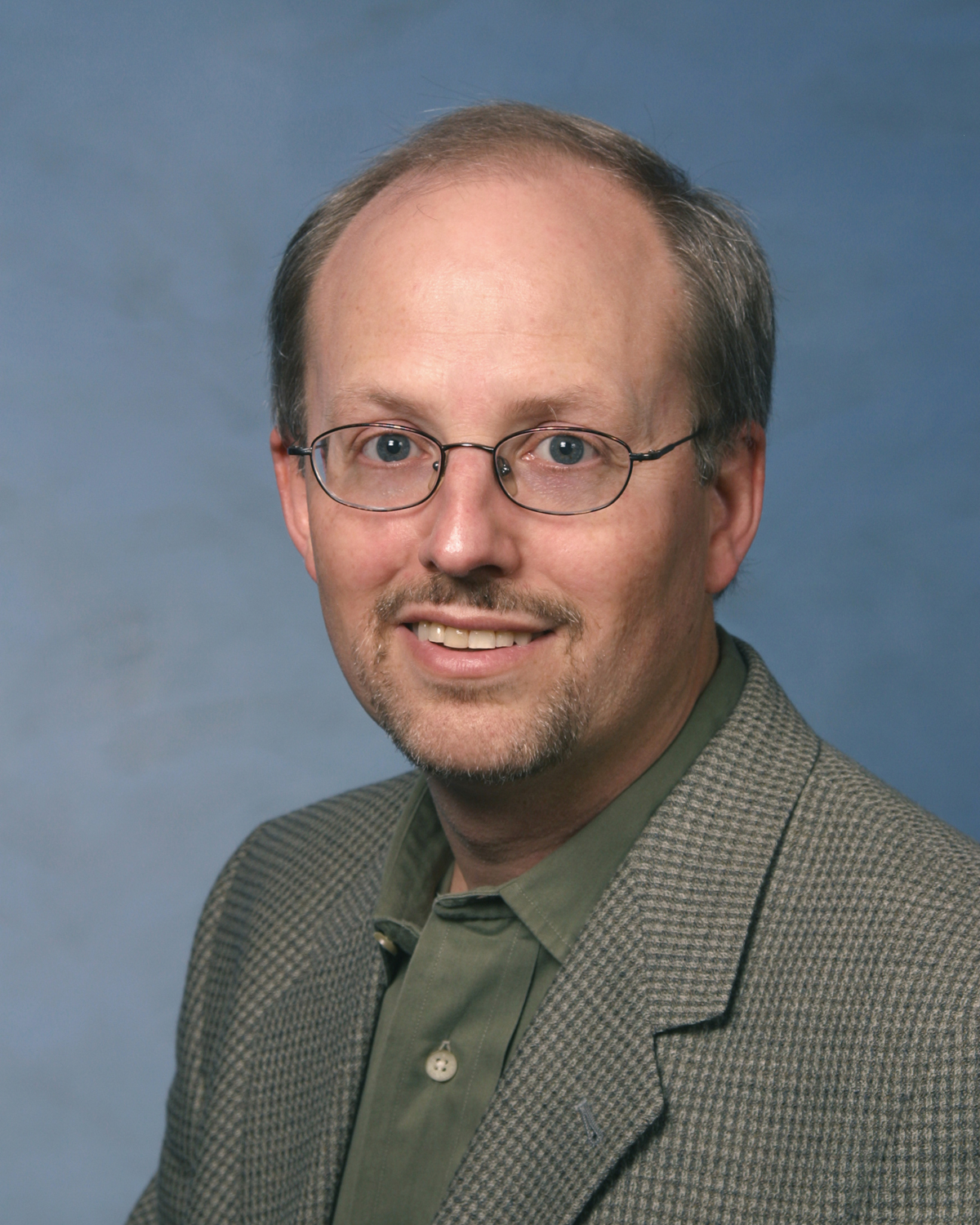
- Born: 1954 (age 71–72); New York City, New York, U.S.

Academic background
- Education: Princeton University (BA); Stanford University (MA, PhD)
- Doctoral advisor: Kenneth Arrow

Academic work
- Discipline: Political economy Economic history Political history Middle East; Islamic studies
- Institutions: University of Southern California; Duke University
- Notable ideas: Preference falsification

Timur Kuran is a Turkish-American economist and political scientist currently serving as a professor of Economics and Political Science, and Gorter Family Professor of Islamic Studies at Duke University. His research lies at the intersection of economics, political science, history, and law.

== Early life and education ==
Kuran was born in 1954 in New York City, where his parents were graduate students at Yale University. They returned to Turkey, and he spent his early childhood in Ankara, where his father, Aptullah Kuran, taught at Middle East Technical University. The family moved to Istanbul in 1969, when the senior Kuran joined the faculty of Robert College, whose higher education side became Boğaziçi University in 1971.

Kuran obtained his secondary education in Istanbul, graduating from Robert College in 1973. He went on to study economics at Princeton University, graduating magna cum laude in 1977. He obtained his doctorate in economics at Stanford University in 1982, under the supervision of Kenneth Arrow.

== Academic career ==
Kuran taught at University of Southern California between 1982 and 2007, where he held the King Faisal professorship in Islamic Thought and Culture from 1993 onwards. He moved to Duke University in 2007, as Gorter Family Professor of Islamic Studies and with a joint appointment in the departments of Economics and Political Science.

Kuran's visiting positions include: Institute for Advanced Study (1989–90), Graduate School of Business, University of Chicago; (1996–1997), Economics Department, Stanford University (2004–2005), Law School, Yale University (2020).

From 2008 to 2014 Kuran served on the executive committee of the International Economic Association. He is a founding member of the Association for Analytic Learning about Islam and Muslim Societies (AALIMS), which he has directed since its establishment in 2011.

Kuran was the founding editor of the University of Michigan Press book series Economics, Cognition, and Society (1989–2006). Since 2009, he has been co-editor of the Cambridge University Press series Cambridge Studies in Economics, Choice, and Society, which he co-founded with Peter Boettke. He has co-edited the Journal of Comparative Economics since 2017.

Kuran is a promoter of freedom of expression, within and outside academia. In 2021, he became a co-founding member of the Academic Freedom Alliance (AFA). In 2022, he joined the Advisory Council of the Foundation for Individual Rights and Expression (FIRE).

== Research ==
Four themes stand out in Kuran's research: preference falsification, the roles of Islamic institutions in the economic performance of the Middle East, the economic agenda of contemporary Islamism, and the political legacies of Islamic institutions in the Middle East. The last three themes benefit from his passion for collecting Ottoman and Turkish documents.

=== Preference falsification ===
Kuran coined the term preference falsification in a 1987 article to describe the act of misrepresenting one's wants under perceived social pressures. It involves tailoring one's expressed preferences to what appears socially acceptable or politically advantageous. His subsequent works argue that the phenomenon is ubiquitous and that it can have huge social, political, and economic consequences. The effects hinge on interdependencies between the personal preferences that individuals choose to express publicly. A broad statement of his argument is in Private Truths, Public Lies: The Social Consequences of Preference Falsification. This 1995 book explains how preference falsification shapes collective decisions, orients structural change, distorts human knowledge, and conceals political possibilities.

An April 1989 article by Kuran, "Sparks and prairie fires: A theory of unanticipated political revolution", presented the French Revolution (1789), the Russian Revolution (1917), and the Iranian Revolution (1979) as examples of events that stunned the world; and it explained how preference falsification, combined with interdependencies among publicly expressed preferences, keeps people from anticipating political earthquakes that are easily explained in retrospect. After the East European Revolutions of late 1989, Kuran explained why seasoned experts of the Communist Bloc were caught off guard in “Now Out of Never: The Element of Surprise in the East European Revolution of 1989”. These papers and Private Truths, Public Lies suggest that political revolutions and big shifts in public opinion will surprise the world repeatedly, because of people's readiness, under perceived social pressures, to conceal their political dispositions.

Kuran has used his theory to shed light on the persistence of East European communism despite its inefficiencies, why India's caste system has remained a powerful institution for millennia, transformations of American race relations, the aggravation of ethnic conflicts through a self-reinforcing process whereby ethnic symbols gain salience and practical significance, (with Cass Sunstein) the eruption of mass hysteria over minor risks, and American polarization.

=== Islam and economic performance of the Middle East ===
In the mid-1990s, Kuran started exploring the drivers of the Middle East's economic trajectory from the birth of Islam to the present. His focus has been on the roles of Islamic law (Sharia) in shaping economic opportunities.

During Islam's early centuries, Kuran observes, the economic content of Islamic law was well-suited to global economic conditions. As such, the Middle East was an economically advanced region. Subsequently, it failed to match the institutional transformation through which Western Europe vastly increased its capacity to pool resources, coordinate production, and conduct trade. Although the Middle East's economic institutions never froze, in certain areas central to economic modernization changes were minimal until the 1800s, at least in comparison to structural transformations in the West.

The Long Divergence: How Islamic Law Held Back the Middle East is Kuran's broadest account of this thesis. There, he suggests that several elements of Islamic law helped to turn the Middle East into an economic laggard. Because of its egalitarian character, the Islamic law of inheritance inhibited capital accumulation, and it curtailed needs for organizational innovations to scale up the pooling of capital and labor. The lack of an Islamic concept of corporation also hindered organizational development; in addition, it kept entrepreneurs politically weak. The waqf, Islam's distinct form of trust, locked vast resources into organizations prone to becoming dysfunctional.

None of these institutions were disadvantageous at their emergence, suggests Kuran; they solved identifiable problems. None caused an absolute decline in economic activity. Each became a handicap by perpetuating itself during the millennium when Western Europe spearheaded economic modernization.

A popular argument is that Islam fosters a conservative ethos that promotes resistance to adaptation. Had conservatism per se made the Middle East fall behind, Kuran says, adjustments would have lagged across the board. But even as institutions of the private economy stalled, military and taxation systems were reformed repeatedly. That commercial and financial organizations were not scaled up points to an institutional trap, not conservative attitudes. Inefficient institutions perpetuated themselves as their interactions dampened incentives to innovate. When in the 1800s the rise of the West created an existential threat, institutional transplants followed. The borrowed institutions perform functions long met through Islamic institutions.

The Islamic institutions that delayed the Middle East's economic modernization no longer block economic development directly, claims Kuran. But patterns they fostered, including low trust in institutions, rampant corruption, and widespread nepotism, are impeding the region's catch-up.

Kuran's research on the Middle East's economic history draws on data collected from Istanbul's Islamic court archives. His data from the 1600s has been published as a ten-volume bilingual set.

=== Functions of Islamic economics ===
Kuran's research agenda has included exploring the origins, logic, and initiatives of Islamic economics, a doctrine that claims to offer an alternative to capitalism and socialism. Its initiatives include the establishment of Islamic financial institutions meant to avoid interest. It also promotes Islamic behavioral norms and has founded anti-poverty systems inspired by zakat practices in seventh-century Arabia, in Islam's earliest decades.

Kuran argues that the doctrine of Islamic economics is incoherent and largely irrelevant to present challenges. Its practical applications have had no discernible effects on efficiency, trust, or poverty reduction. Its real purpose has not been economic improvement but the cultivation of a distinct Islamic identity. It has served global-Islamism (known also as Islamic fundamentalism) by fuelling the illusion that modern Muslim societies can live by economic rules based on Islam.

A comprehensive statement of Kuran's analysis and interpretation of Islamic economics is Islam and Mammon: The Economic Predicaments of Islamism. Islamic financial firms deal in interest routinely, he argues there, through ruses that make interest appear as a return to risk. Their operations do not differ, except symbolically, from those of conventional financial firms with which they compete. He also observes that modern zakat systems shuffle resources within the middle class or redistribute from poor to rich. Finally, he points to the lack of evidence that Islamic economics has improved trust or trustworthiness.

Following Fazlur Rahman, Kuran argues that Islamic economics misunderstands the original functions of Quran-based Islamic institutions.

Kuran has written on the Islamic controversy over the permissibility of interest; the origins, historical functions, and modern variants of zakat; and Islamic credit cards.

=== Islam and political performance of the Middle East ===
With a focus on the Middle East's institutional history, Kuran has explored why its modern states tend to be governed autocratically and why the region fares poorly in global indices of freedom. He proposes that three Islamic institutions played critical roles. Though designed to bind the state, Islam's original tax system was sidelined within a couple of generations. This Islamic waqf (as opposed to the modern waqf, which is a corporation) kept civic life anaemic by restricting political participation and hindering collective action from below. And private commercial enterprises remained small and ephemeral, hindering the formation of stable coalitions capable of bargaining with the state.

=== Ottoman and Turkish documents ===
In his childhood and early adulthood, Timur Kuran collected postal stamps. As his academic career began and research foci changed, his collecting interests turned to poorly studied areas: (1) Ottoman and Turkish postal history and postal stationery; (2) Ottoman and Turkish revenue stamps; and, increasingly, (3) Ottoman and Turkish documents, with an emphasis on evidence relating to the modernization of economic and civic life.

In the third category, his major collections are on the following topics: official revenue stamps and their usages; Ottoman occupations; foreign occupations of Ottoman territories; private and semi-official social assistance; printing, the press, and publishing; banking and insurance; political organizations; education; and lotteries. These collections are furnishing data to Kuran's ongoing academic research on Ottoman and Turkish modernization from the late 1700s.

He has co-authored, with Mehmet Akan, volume 1 of an intended bilingual trilogy on the microhistory of the Turkish postal system.
