= Contagious depression =

Spread of depression among a social group

Contagious depression is "a theory proposing that depression can be induced or triggered by our social environment". This is a form of emotional and social contagion, or mass psychogenic illness, that psychologists such as Fritz Redl and Ladd Wheeler have long studied. Similar to social contagion it presents itself in two ways: behavioral contagion and emotional contagion. Behavioral is based on physical changes in a person's actions while emotional has to do with a person's mood. This phenomenon is similar to the concept of an "empath" in the way that someone's emotions affect another person. Many studies also show that the mere proximity a person has to someone with depression the more likely they are to get it. This is because of the idea of "mirror neuron systems". This idea shows that people internalize and process the emotions of others as their own and end up transmitting this learned emotion to others.

== History ==
The earliest recounts of contagious depression date back to the ancient Greeks and Romans who discovered that there are environmental factors that affect mental health and overall well-being and that the results of this also influence those around them. Many years after this there was a term coined to explain this and it was "behavioral contagion". It was introduced by Gustave Le Bon in his work published in 1895, titled "The Crowd: A Study of the Popular Mind". A decade later the term “social contagion” was coined by Herbert Blumer to be a broad umbrella term. Following this, other researchers such as Kurt Lewin and Muzafer Sherif went on to further study the influence that social factors may have on individual behavior, which made a foundation for more studies to be done on this sort of mental contagion.

== Studies ==
In 1994 a study was conducted on 100 college roommates and the results showed that spending three weeks in the same room as a depressed roommate increased the risk and frequency of depression on the other roommate. A different study from 2011 went so far as to suggest that friendships are made and destroyed based on each person's level of depression. When analyzing more than 900 students, it was found that the depression symptoms of the depressed target students converged toward an “average level” over time, meaning the less depressed kids became more depressed, and vice versa. Another study done in Denmark tracked depression drug usage to decipher the hypothesis that when an individual is depressed there is an increased likelihood that their spouse will also be depressed”. The result supports the hypothesis and furthered the idea that between “spouses, and possibly others who are socially connected, share indicators of depression”.

== In relationships ==
A number of studies show that people in relationships with someone who is depressed are at a higher risk for developing depression themselves. A study conducted in 1992 by Hatfield, Cacioppo, and Rapson asserts that people in committed, intimate relationships are more invested in their partner's moods which serves as a rich context for emotional contagion, and due to this, this group is greatly influenced by the contagious depression. These studies also suggest that reassurance-seeking tendencies are excessive when it comes to those in relationships who are depressed. According to Coyne's Interactional Theory of Depression, people who engage in these types of tendencies are more likely to be prone to depression when their partners don't give them this validation. Coyne claims that depressed people create negative effects on others and that this leads to a cycle of interaction between a depressed and the other which in turn ends up succumbing to these feelings because of the repetitive exposure. There are a number of things that can account for this contagion among spouses higher than any other demographic. One of the claims is that spouses empathize with their partners and in turn, they end up sharing one emotion. Another reason is that someone with depression is simply not enjoyable to be around hence it decreases the partner's mental health. Two other factors are the proximity between spouses and the guilt that comes of being partners with someone with depression which in turn leads to depression from this partner as well.

== Criticism ==
Contagious depression has faced some criticism especially because there is no direct definition. Additionally, skeptics may argue that the spread of depressive tendencies and symptoms doesn't necessarily imply a sort of causation and it may be more of a “coincidence”. Another criticism is the oversimplification of depression. Saying that it is just a contagion makes it seem like anyone can suffer from it and that it is just like any common flu. The last criticism is that some scholars believe that this type of behavior is better described through a different concept.
