= Behavioral contagion =

Spontaneous, unsolicited and uncritical imitation of another's behavior

Behavioral contagion is a form of social contagion involving the spread of behavior through a group. It refers to the propensity for a person to copy a certain behavior of others who are either in the vicinity, or whom they have been exposed to. The term was originally used by Gustave Le Bon in his 1895 work The Crowd: A Study of the Popular Mind to explain undesirable aspects of behavior of people in crowds. In the digital age, behavioral contagion is also concerned with the spread of online behavior and information. A variety of behavioral contagion mechanisms were incorporated in models of collective human behavior.

Behavioral contagion has been attributed to a variety of different factors. Often it is distinguished from collective behavior that arises from a direct attempt at social influence. A prominent theory involves the reduction of restraints, put forth by Fritz Redl in 1949 and analyzed in depth by Ladd Wheeler in 1966. Social psychologists acknowledge a number of other factors, which influence the likelihood of behavioral contagion occurring, such as deindividuation (Festinger, Pepitone, & Newcomb, 1952) and the emergence of social norms (Turner, 1964). In 1980, Freedman et al. have focused on the effects of physical factors on contagion, in particular, density and number.

J. O. Ogunlade (1979, p. 205) describes behavioral contagion as a "spontaneous, unsolicited and uncritical imitation of another's behavior" that occurs when certain variables are met: a) the observer and the model share a similar situation or mood (this is one way behavioral contagion can be readily applied to mob psychology); b) the model's behavior encourages the observer to review his condition and to change it; c) the model's behavior would assist the observer to resolve a conflict by reducing restraints, if copied; and d) the model is assumed to be a positive reference individual.

== Types of contagion ==
Social contagion can occur through threshold models that assume that an individual needs to be convinced by a fraction of their social contacts above a given threshold to adopt a novel behaviour. Therefore, the number of exposures will not increase chances of contagion unless the number of source exposures pass a certain threshold. The threshold value can divide contagion processes to two types: 1) Simple contagion and 2) Complex contagion.

=== Simple contagion ===
The individual needs only one person displaying the novel behaviour to copy. For instance, cars travel in groups on a two-lane highway since the car in each cluster travels at a slower speed than the car behind it. This relative speed spreads through other cars who slow down to match the speed of the car in front.

=== Complex contagion ===
The individual needs to be in contact with two or more sources exhibiting the novel behaviour. This is when copying behaviours needs reinforcement or encouragement from multiple sources. Multiple sources, especially close friends, can make imitation legitimate, credible and worthwhile due to collective effort put in. Examples of complex contagions include a New York University School of Business study in California which found that households were more likely to install solar panels in neighborhoods that already had them, and that the rate of installation increases with more and more installations, creating a chain reaction that added up to a significant increase in solar adoption. Other examples can be copying risky behaviour or joining social movements and riots.

== Factors ==
=== Strength of ties ===
Social contagion in simple contagion models occurs most effectively through 'weak' and 'long' ties between social contacts. A 'weak' tie between two people means they do not interact as frequently and do not influence each other as close friends. However, a relationally 'weak' tie is structurally strong if it is 'long' because it connects socially distant people, showing greater outreach than a relationally 'strong' tie. These 'long' ties allow the flow of new information increasing rate of transmission that relationally strong ties cannot do. Even though close friends can strongly influence each other, they will not help each other learn about new opportunities, ideas or behaviours in socially distant settings if they all know the same things. Few 'weak' and 'long' ties can help spread information quickly between two socially distant strong networks of people. 'Strong' ties within those networks can help spread information amongst the peers.

On the other hand, complex social contagion processes require multiple sources of influence. This is not possible with few 'weak' ties: they need to be long and multiple in number to increase the probability of imitation between socially distant networks.

==== Structural equivalence ====
However, social contagion can also occur in the absence of any ties during competition. This happens when two people are structurally equivalent i.e., they occupy the same position in a social network and have the same pattern of relationships with the same people. For instance, two students publishing the same kind of research under the same professor are structurally equivalent. The more similar their relations are with other people i.e. the more substitutable they are with one another, the more they will copy what the other is doing, if it makes them look better, to stay ahead of competition.

=== Reduction of restraints ===
Behavioral contagion is a result of the reduction of fear or restraints – aspects of a group or situation which prevent certain behaviors from being performed. Restraints are typically group-derived, meaning that the "observer", the individual wishing to perform a certain behavior, is constrained by the fear of rejection by the group, who would view this behavior as a "lack of impulse control".

An individual (the "observer") wants to perform some behavior, but that behavior would violate the unspoken and accepted rules of the group or situation they are in; these rules are the restraints preventing the observer from performing that action. Once the restraints are broken or reduced the observer is then "free" to perform the behavior; this is achieved by the "intervention" of the model. The model is another individual, in the same group or situation as the observer, who performs the behavior which the observer wished to perform. Stephenson and Fielding (1971) describe this effect as "[Once] one member of a gathering has performed a commonly desired action, the payoffs for similar action or nonaction are materially altered. ... [The] initiator, by his action, establishes an inequitable advantage over the other members of the gathering which they may proceed to nullify by following his example."

=== Density and number ===
Density refers to the amount of space available to a person – high density meaning there is less space per person – and number refers to the size of the group. Freedman (1975) put forth the intensification theory, which posits that high density makes the other people in a group more salient features of the environment, this magnifying the individual's reaction to them. Research has shown that high density does in fact increase the likelihood of contagion (Freedman, 1975; Freedman, Birsky, & Cavoukian, 1980). Number also has an effect on contagion, but to a lesser degree than density.

==== Local trend imitation ====
However, the probability that an individual will copy a behaviour can also decrease with higher density and number of neighbours. For instance, a person might praise and go to a restaurant with good food based on others’ recommendations but avoid it when it becomes over-crowded. This depicts the local trend imitation phenomenon i.e. the adoption probability first increases with increase in number of adopted neighbours and then decreases.

=== Identity of the model ===
Stephenson and Fielding (1971) state that the identity of the model is a factor that influences contagion (p. 81). Depending on the behavior, sex of the model may be a factor in the contagion of that behavior being performed by other individuals – particularly in instances of adult models performing aggressive behavior in the presence of children-observers (Bandura, Ross, & Ross, 1963) {Imitation of film-mediated aggressive models}. In this particular series of experiments – Albert Bandura's Bobo doll experiments from 1961 and 1963 – where the behavior of children was studied after the children watched an adult model punching a bobo doll and the model received a reward, a punishment, or there were no consequences, the analyses revealed that the male model influenced the participants' behavior to a greater extent than did the female model; this was true for both the aggressive and the nonaggressive male models (p. 581).

==== Dominant leaders ====
Aggressive behaviour or using coercion, fear or intimidation to imitate a behaviour is known as dominance. People are likely to follow dominant leaders to avoid the cost of punishment. However, such behaviour is more influential amongst children rather than adults: coercive children are thought to be more likeable whereas coercive adults are less likeable and, hence, influential.

==== Prestigious influencers ====
While dominant behaviour is also observed in the animal kingdom, prestigious behaviour is thought to be unique to humans. Humans can infer the intentions behind someone's actions, rather than just imitating their movements precisely. This is important since it can be easier to learn from the best models rather than learning by ourselves: We might not know which behaviour contributes to someone's success at mastering a skill. Hence, we look to see who everyone else is copying i.e. we tend to copy prestigious individuals. Prestigious people enjoy a high degree of influence and respect and are generally the people with the most information.

==== Ordinary people ====
A study done on the rate of information transmission via retweets on Twitter found that popular people i.e. people with a large following, are 'inefficient hubs' in spreading concepts. The more followers someone has, the more overloaded they are with information and lower the chances that they will retweet a particular message due to limited attention. Hence, rate of social contagion slows down.

Rather, social contagion can amplify amongst 'ordinary' users with low following if they are closely connected in a peer network. People are more likely to retweet messages by close friends to facilitate social bonding. Peers also have higher similar interests and are more influenced by each other than an 'ordinary' and 'popular' user who do not have mutual ties. Hence, social contagion can occur efficiently amongst tight community structures, in the absence of prestigious and dominant leaders.

==== Media ====
Mass media can greatly influence people's opinions and amplify social contagion by reporting stories from socially distant and unconnected networks. They can help to turn minority opinions into the popular opinion, independent of the degree of connectivity between people.

Moreover, Bandura (1977) showed that children can learn and imitate fictitious characters on television.

=== Personality of the observer ===
Ogunlade (1979) found that extroverts, who are described as impulsive and sociable individuals, are more likely to be susceptible to contagion than introverted individuals, who are described as reserved and emotionally controlled.

=== Social norms ===
Gino, Ayal and Ariely (2009) state that an important factor influencing contagion is the degree to which the observer identifies with the others of the group (p. 394). When identification with the rest of the group is strong, the behaviors of the others will have a larger influence.

However, high homophily or the likelihood of being connected to others with similar interests, can lead to both minority and majority groups overestimating their sizes and vice versa. This can cause people to falsely predict the frequency of their behaviour in the real world since they estimate based on their personal networks. When people overestimate the frequency of a particular behaviour, they may think that they are following social norms and, hence, are less willing to change. Encouraging interactions within heterophilic rather than homophilic social networks can facilitate social contagion more.

== Similarities and differences with other types of social influence ==
Contagion is only one of a myriad of types of social influence.

=== Conformity / social pressures ===
Conformity is a type of social influence that is very similar to contagion. It is almost identical to another type of social influence, "pressures toward uniformity" (social pressures) (Festinger, 1954), which differ only in the research techniques they are associated with (Wheeler, 1966, p. 182).

Both conformity and contagion involve some sort of conflict, but differ in the roles other individuals play in that conflict. In conformity, the other individuals of the group try to pressure the observer into performing a behavior; the model then performs some other behavior in the vicinity of the observer. This results in the observer creating restraints against the pressured behavior and a conflict between the pressured behavior and the behavior performed by the model. In the end, the observer either performs the model's behavior his-/herself, rejects the model, or pressures the model to perform the original pressured behavior (Wheeler, Table 1). In contagion, the model's behavior results in the removing of restraints and the resolving of the conflict, while in conformity, the model's behavior results in the creation of restraints and of the conflict.

=== Social facilitation ===
Social facilitation, another type of social influence, is distinguished from contagion, as well as from conformity and social pressures, by the lack of any marked conflict. It is said to occur when the performance of an instinctive pattern of behavior by an individual acts as a releaser for the same behavior in others, and so initiates the same line of action in the whole group (Thorpe, 1956, p. 120). Bandura and Walters (1963, p. 79), give the example of an adult, who has lost the unique aspects of the dialect of the region where they were raised, returns for a visit and "regains" those previously lost patterns of speech. Starch (1911) referred to this phenomenon as an "unintentional or unconscious imitation".

=== Imitation ===
Imitation is different from contagion in that it is learned via reward and punishment and is generalized across situations. Imitation can also be a generic term for contagion, conformity, social pressures, and social facilitation.

(Wheeler, 1966, Table 1)	Dynamics of selected influence processes		
Stages in influence process	Behavioral contagion	Social pressures and conformity	Social facilitation
Observer's initial conditions	Instigated to BN*. Internal restraints against BN.	Instigated to BP*. No restraints.	No restraints against BN or BP. No instigation to BN or BP.
Model's behavior	Model performs BN.	Model performs BN.	Model performs BN.
Hypothetical processes	Reduction of model's restraints against BN. Fear reduction.	Creation of restraints against BP. Conflict between BN and BP.	Cognitive-behavioral chaining, CS* elicits CR*, inertia overcome.
Observer's behavior	Observer performs BN.	Observer performs BN (or rejects model or induces model to perform BP).	Observer performs BN.

- BN = initial behavior
- BP = pressured behavior
- CS = conditioned stimulus
- CR = conditioned response

=== Competition contagion on non-competitors ===
While behavioral contagion is largely about how people might be affected by observations of the expressions or behavior of others, research has also found contagion in the context of a competition where mere awareness of an ongoing competition can have an influence on noncompetitors' task performance, without any information about the actual behavior of the competitors.

== Research ==
=== Effects of group pressure ===
Behavioral contagion, largely discussed in the behaviors of crowds, and closely related to emotional contagion, plays a large role in gatherings of two or more people. In the original Milgram experiment on obedience, for example, where participants, who were in a room with only the experimenter, were ordered to administer increasingly more severe electrical shocks as punishment to a person in another room (from here on referred to as the "victim"), the conflict or social restraint experienced by the participants was the obligation to not disobey the experimenter – even when shocking the victim to the highest shock level given, a behavior which the participants saw as opposing their personal and social ideals (Milgram, 1965, p. 129).

Stanley Milgram also conducted two other experiments, replications of his original obedience experiment, with the intent being to analyze the effect of group behavior on participants: instead of the subject being alone with the experimenter, two confederates were utilized. In the first of the two experiments, "Groups for Disobedience", the confederates defied the experimenter and refused to punish the victim (p. 130). This produced a significant effect on the obedience of the participants: in the original experiment, 26 of the 40 participants administered the maximum shock; in the disobedient groups experiment, only 4 of 40 participants administered the highest level of voltage (Table 1). Despite this high correlation between shock level administered and the obedience of the group in the disobedient groups experiment, there was no significant correlation for the second of the replicated experiments: "Obedient Groups", where the confederates did not disobey the experimenter and, when the participant voiced angst regarding the experiment and wished to stop administering volts to the victim, the confederates voiced their disapproval (p. 133). Milgram concludes the study by remarking that "the insertion of group pressure in a direction opposite that of the experimenter's commands produces a powerful shift toward the group. Changing the group movement does not yield a comparable shift in the [participant's] performance. The group success in one case and failure in another can be traced directly to the configuration of motive and social forces operative in the starting situation." That is, if the group's attitudes are similar to or compatible with the participant's/observer's, there is a greater likelihood that the participant/observer will join with the group (p. 134).

=== Overweight and obesity ===
Network phenomena are relevant to obesity, which appears to spread through social ties. Teenagers of US Army families assigned to counties with higher obesity rates were more likely to become overweight or obese in a 2018 study. This effect could not be explained by self-selection (homophily) or shared built environments and is attributed to social contagion.

== See also ==
- Domino theory
- Cycle of violence
- Copycat suicide – Emulation of another suicide
- Crime Contagion Models
- Hysterical contagion – Psychological phenomenon
- Mass psychogenic illness, also known as Mass hysteria – Spread of illness without organic cause
- Peer contagion
