= Emotional contagion =

Spontaneous spread of emotions among a group

Emotional contagion is a form of social contagion that involves the spontaneous spread of emotions and related behaviors. Such emotional convergence can happen from one person to another, or in a larger group. Emotions can be shared across individuals in many ways, both implicitly or explicitly. For instance, conscious reasoning, analysis, and imagination have all been found to contribute to the phenomenon. The behaviour has been found in humans, other primates, dogs, and chickens.

Emotional contagion is important to personal relationships because it fosters emotional synchrony between individuals. A broader definition of the phenomenon suggested by Schoenewolf is "a process in which a person or group influences the emotions or behavior of another person or group through the conscious or unconscious induction of emotion states and behavioral attitudes." One view developed by Elaine Hatfield, et al., is that this can be done through automatic mimicry and synchronization of one's expressions, vocalizations, postures, and movements with those of another person. When people unconsciously mirror their companions' expressions of emotion, they come to feel reflections of those companions' emotions.

In a 1993 paper, psychologists Elaine Hatfield, John Cacioppo, and Richard Rapson define emotional contagion as "the tendency to automatically mimic and synchronize expressions, vocalizations, postures, and movements with those of another person's [sic] and, consequently, to converge emotionally".

Hatfield, et al., theorize emotional contagion as a two-step process: First, we imitate people (e.g., if someone smiles at you, you smile back). Second, our own emotional experiences change based on the non-verbal signals of emotion that we give off. For example, smiling makes one feel happier, and frowning makes one feel worse. Mimicry seems to be one foundation of emotional movement between people.

Emotional contagion and empathy share similar characteristics, with the exception of the ability to differentiate between personal and pre-personal experiences, a process known as individuation. In The Art of Loving (1956), social psychologist Erich Fromm explores these differences, suggesting that autonomy is necessary for empathy, which is not found in emotional contagion.

Abnormally pervasive emotional contagion is a known symptom of some psychiatric disorders, such as borderline personality disorder. In BPD, this is a result of mirroring that arises from an unstable sense of self.

== Etymology ==
James Baldwin addressed "emotional contagion" in his 1897 work Social and Ethical Interpretations in Mental Development, though using the term "contagion of feeling". Various 20th century scholars discussed the phenomena under the heading "social contagion". The term "emotional contagion" first appeared in Arthur S. Reber's 1985 The Penguin Dictionary of Psychology.

== Influencing factors ==
Several factors determine the rate and extent of emotional convergence in a group, including membership stability, mood-regulation norms, task interdependence, and social interdependence. Besides these event-structure properties, there are personal properties of the group's members, such as openness to receive and transmit feelings, demographic characteristics, and dispositional affect that influence the intensity of emotional contagion.

=== Research ===
Research on emotional contagion has been conducted from a variety of perspectives, including organizational, social, familial, developmental, and neurological. While early research suggested that conscious reasoning, analysis, and imagination accounted for emotional contagion, some forms of more primitive emotional contagion are far more subtle, automatic, and universal.

Hatfield, Cacioppo, and Rapson's 1993 research into emotional contagion reported that people's conscious assessments of others' feelings were heavily influenced by what others said. People's own emotions, however, were more influenced by others' nonverbal clues as to what they were really feeling. Recognizing emotions and acknowledging their origin can be one way to avoid emotional contagion. Transference of emotions has been studied in a variety of situations and settings, with social and physiological causes being two of the largest areas of research.

In addition to the social contexts discussed above, emotional contagion has been studied within organizations. Schrock, Leaf, and Rohr (2008) say organizations, like societies, have emotion cultures that consist of languages, rituals, and meaning systems, including rules about the feelings workers should, and should not, feel and display. They state that emotion culture is quite similar to "emotion climate", otherwise known as morale, organizational morale, and corporate morale. Furthermore, Worline, Wrzesniewski, and Rafaeli (2002) mention that organizations have an overall "emotional capability", while McColl-Kennedy, and Smith (2006) examine "emotional contagion" in customer interactions. These terms arguably all attempt to describe a similar phenomenon; each term differs in subtle and somewhat indistinguishable ways.

=== Controversy ===
A controversial experiment demonstrating emotional contagion by using the social media platform Facebook was carried out in 2014 on 689,000 users by filtering positive or negative emotional content from their news feeds. The experiment sparked uproar among people who felt the study violated personal privacy. The 2014 publication of a research paper resulting from this experiment, "Experimental evidence of massive-scale emotional contagion through social networks", a collaboration between Facebook and Cornell University, is described by Tony D. Sampson, Stephen Maddison, and Darren Ellis (2018) as a "disquieting disclosure that corporate social media and Cornell academics were so readily engaged with unethical experiments of this kind." Tony D. Sampson et al. criticize the notion that "academic researchers can be insulated from ethical guidelines on the protection for human research subjects because they are working with a social media business that has 'no obligation to conform' to the principle of 'obtaining informed consent and allowing participants to opt out'." A subsequent study confirmed the presence of emotional contagion on Twitter without manipulating users' timelines.

Beyond the ethical concerns, some scholars criticized the methods and reporting of the Facebook findings. John Grohol, writing for Psych Central, argued that despite its title and claims of "emotional contagion," this study did not look at emotions at all. Instead, its authors used an application (called "Linguistic Inquiry and Word Count" or LIWC 2007) that simply counted positive and negative words in order to infer users' sentiments. A shortcoming of the LIWC tool is that it does not understand negations. Hence, the tweet "I am not happy" would be scored as positive: "Since the LIWC 2007 ignores these subtle realities of informal human communication, so do the researchers." Grohol concluded that given these subtleties, the effect size of the findings are little more than a "statistical blip."

Kramer et al. (2014) found a 0.07%—that's not 7 percent, that's 1/15th of one percent!!—decrease in negative words in people's status updates when the number of negative posts on their Facebook news feed decreased. Do you know how many words you'd have to read or write before you've written one less negative word due to this effect? Probably thousands.

== Types ==
Emotions can be shared and mimicked in many ways. Taken broadly, emotional contagion can be either: implicit, undertaken by the receiver through automatic or self-evaluating processes; or explicit, undertaken by the transmitter through a purposeful manipulation of emotional states, to achieve a desired result.

=== Implicit ===
Unlike cognitive contagion, emotional contagion is less conscious and more automatic. It relies mainly on non-verbal communication, although emotional contagion can and does occur via telecommunication. For example, people interacting through e-mails and chats are affected by the other's emotions, without being able to perceive the non-verbal cues.

One view, proposed by Hatfield and colleagues, describes emotional contagion as a primitive, automatic, and unconscious behavior that takes place through a series of steps. When a receiver is interacting with a sender, he perceives the emotional expressions of the sender. The receiver automatically mimics those emotional expressions. Through the process of afferent feedback, these new expressions are translated into feeling the emotions the sender feels, thus leading to emotional convergence.

Another view, emanating from social comparison theories, sees emotional contagion as demanding more cognitive effort and being more conscious. According to this view, people engage in social comparison to see if their emotional reaction is congruent with the persons around them. The recipient uses the emotion as a type of social information to understand how he or she should be feeling. People respond differently to positive and negative stimuli; negative events tend to elicit stronger and quicker emotional, behavioral, and cognitive responses than neutral or positive events. So unpleasant emotions are more likely to lead to mood contagion than are pleasant emotions. Another variable is the energy level at which the emotion is displayed. Higher energy draws more attention to it, so the same emotional valence (pleasant or unpleasant) expressed with high energy is likely to lead to more contagion than if expressed with low energy.

=== Explicit ===
Aside from the automatic infection of feelings described above, there are also times when others' emotions are being manipulated by a person or a group in order to achieve something. This can be a result of intentional affective influence by a leader or team member. Suppose this person wants to convince the others of something, he may do so by sweeping them up in his enthusiasm. In such a case, his positive emotions are an act with the purpose of "contaminating" the others' feelings. A different kind of intentional mood contagion would be, for instance, giving the group a reward or treat, in order to alleviate their feelings.

The discipline of organizational psychology researches aspects of emotional labor. This includes the need to manage emotions so that they are consistent with organizational or occupational display rules, regardless of whether they are discrepant with internal feelings. In regard to emotional contagion, in work settings that require a certain display of emotions, one finds oneself obligated to display, and consequently feel, these emotions. If superficial acting develops into deep acting, emotional contagion is the byproduct of intentional affective impression management.

== Cognitive development during pregnancy ==
Emotional contagion contributes to cognitive development initiated in pregnancy. According to a hypothesis of pre-perceptual multimodal integration, the association of affective cues with stimuli responsible for triggering the neuronal pathways of simple reflexes (such as spontaneous blinking, etc.) forms simple neuronal assemblies, shaping the cognitive and emotional neuronal patterns in statistical learning. Empirical evidence showed that cognitive and emotional neuronal patterns are continuously connected with the neuronal pathways of reflexes throughout life.

Emotional and behavioral contagion starts with the fetus mimicking the mother's behavior in utero. Starting at 25 weeks gestation, a greater proportion of unborn babies open their mouths after their mother speaks or sings than making unrelated mouth movements. Furthermore, contagious yawning starts at 7 months gestation. Contagious yawning is when one person's yawn causes another person to yawn. When pregnant mothers watched a video of a person yawning, they were more likely to yawn in the following two minutes, and so were their unborn babies. Therefore, behavioral contagion may be fundamental to social bonding.

== In workplaces and organizations ==
=== Intra-group ===
Many organizations and workplaces encourage teamwork. Studies conducted by organizational psychologists highlight the benefits of work teams. Emotions come into play and a group emotion is formed.

The group's emotional state influences factors such as cohesiveness, morale, rapport, and the team's performance. For this reason, organizations need to take into account the factors that shape the emotional state of the work-teams, in order to harness the beneficial sides and avoid the detrimental sides of the group's emotion. Managers and team leaders should be cautious with their behavior, since their emotional influence is greater than that of a "regular" team member: leaders are more emotionally "contagious" than others.

Positive emotions shared by leaders were found to have positive impact on employees' psychological capital in areas of efficacy, hope, optimism, and resilience. This shows that positive emotions displayed by leadership can have a positive impact on employee wellbeing.

=== Employee/customer ===
The interaction between service employees and customers affects both customers' assessments of service quality and their relationship with the service provider. Positive affective displays in service interactions are positively associated with important customer outcomes, such as intention to return and to recommend the store to a friend. It is the interest of organizations that their customers be happy, since a happy customer is a satisfied one. Research has shown that the emotional state of the customer is directly influenced by the emotions displayed by the employee/service provider via emotional contagion. But this influence depends on authenticity of the employee's emotional display, such that if the employee is only surface-acting, the contagion is poor, in which case the beneficial effects will not occur. Additionally, research also suggests that high levels of positive emotion displayed by an employee can reduce negative emotion in customers and that high levels of negative emotion display from employees will increase negative emotion in customers.

== Online and social media ==
There are conflicting findings related to whether positive or negative emotions are more contagious online. Social media personalities are more likely to receive positive comments when they express positive emotions. Whereas, research regarding online discourse about spending during the COVID-19 crisis indicates that anger is the most contagious emotion on social media and that it decreases spending both immediately and for an extended period of time. Findings related to reviews online have shown that viewing angry negative reviews for hotel can result in anger in the viewer and decrease likelihood of that person staying at the hotel.

== Neurological basis ==
At the neurophysiological level, emotional contagion can result by mechanisms that involve synchronization of brain structures due to laws of physics: electromagnetic interference and quantum effects. These are the same mechanisms that shape cognition. One of the essential issues in cognition and emotions development is the Morphology problem of proper nervous system shaping. Numerous research attempts to explain the precise coordination of all cells in space and time (not even anatomically connected) during embryological processes of cells and tissue differentiation for the shaping of the particular nervous system structure. In cognitive development, shaping the proper nervous system is necessary for emerging multiple brain-based functions that enable humans to perform mental processes such as perception, learning, memory, understanding, awareness, reasoning, judgment, intuition, and language. Our nervous system operates over everything that makes us human. It means that only the formation of neural tissues in a certain way contributes to shaping cognitive functions. Gene activity from interaction with events and experiences in the environment cannot alone shape tissues in morphogenesis since these processes may not be coordinated in time at the gene level. The formation of the nervous system's specific structure should be closely related to the precise coordination in time of all general classes of tissue deformation at the cell level. A complete developmental program with a template to create the final biological structure of the nervous system is required for such a complex dynamic process.

According to professor Igor Val Danilov, electromagnetic properties of the mother's heart and its interaction with the mother's own and fetal nervous system (physical laws of electromagnetic interference) form neuronal coherence in the mother-fetus bio-system, providing the template beginning from pregnancy. This natural neurostimulation ensures the balanced development of the embryo's nervous system and guarantees the development of the correct architecture of the nervous system with the necessary cognitive functions corresponding to the ecological context and the qualities that make human beings unique. Empirical evidence from studies of simple reflexes in newborns has shown that this pre-perceptual multimodal integration form primary neuronal assemblies, further shaping the cognitive and emotional neuronal patterns in statistical learning that succeeds owing to neuronal coherence in mother-child dyads beginning from pregnancy.

A discovery of mirror neurons is likely an appearance of the mechanisms of natural neurostimulation and pre-perceptual multimodal integration.

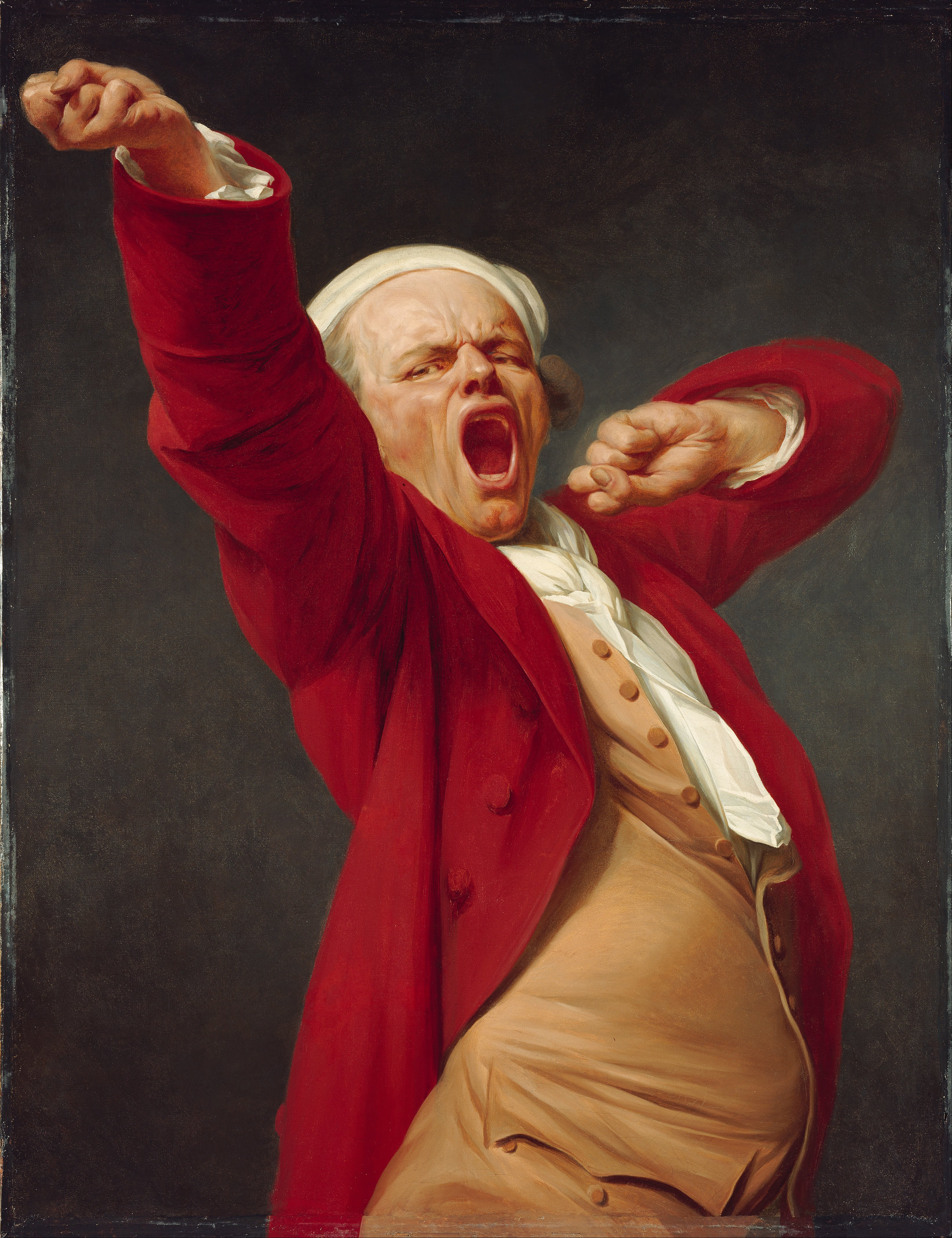
"Contagious" yawning has been observed in humans, chimpanzees, dogs, cats, birds, and reptiles, and can occur across species.

Vittorio Gallese posits that mirror neurons are responsible for intentional attunement in relation to others. Gallese and colleagues at the University of Parma found a class of neurons in the premotor cortex that discharge either when macaque monkeys execute goal-related hand movements or when they watch others doing the same action. One class of these neurons fires with action execution and observation, and with sound production of the same action. Research in humans shows an activation of the premotor cortex and parietal area of the brain for action perception and execution.

Gallese says humans understand emotions through a simulated shared body state. The observers' neural activation enables a direct experiential understanding. "Unmediated resonance" is a similar theory by Goldman and Sripada (2004). Empathy can be a product of the functional mechanism in our brain that creates embodied simulation. The other we see or hear becomes the "other self" in our minds. Other researchers have shown that observing someone else's emotions recruits brain regions involved in (a) experiencing similar emotions and (b) producing similar facial expressions. This combination indicates that the observer activates (a) a representation of the emotional feeling of the other individual which leads to emotional contagion and (b) a motor representation of the observed facial expression that could lead to facial mimicry. In the brain, understanding and sharing other individuals' emotions would thus be a combination of emotional contagion and facial mimicry. Importantly, more empathic individuals experience more brain activation in emotional regions while witnessing the emotions of other individuals.

=== Amygdala ===
The amygdala is one part of the brain that underlies empathy and allows for emotional attunement and creates the pathway for emotional contagion. The basal areas including the brain stem form a tight loop of biological connectedness, re-creating in one person the physiological state of the other. Psychologist Howard Friedman thinks this is why some people can move and inspire others. The use of facial expressions, voices, gestures and body movements transmit emotions to an audience from a speaker.

== See also ==
- Affective neuroscience
- Autism
- Behavioral contagion
- Common coding theory
- Emotional detachment
- Emotional competence
- Folie à deux
- Groupthink
- Limbic resonance
- Limbic regulation
- Mass psychogenic illness
- Microexpression
- Mirror-touch synesthesia
- Peer contagion
- Peer pressure
- Projective identification
- Social contagion
- Social neuroscience
- Viral phenomenon
