= Social contagion =

Spontaneous spread of knowledge, behavior or emotions among a group

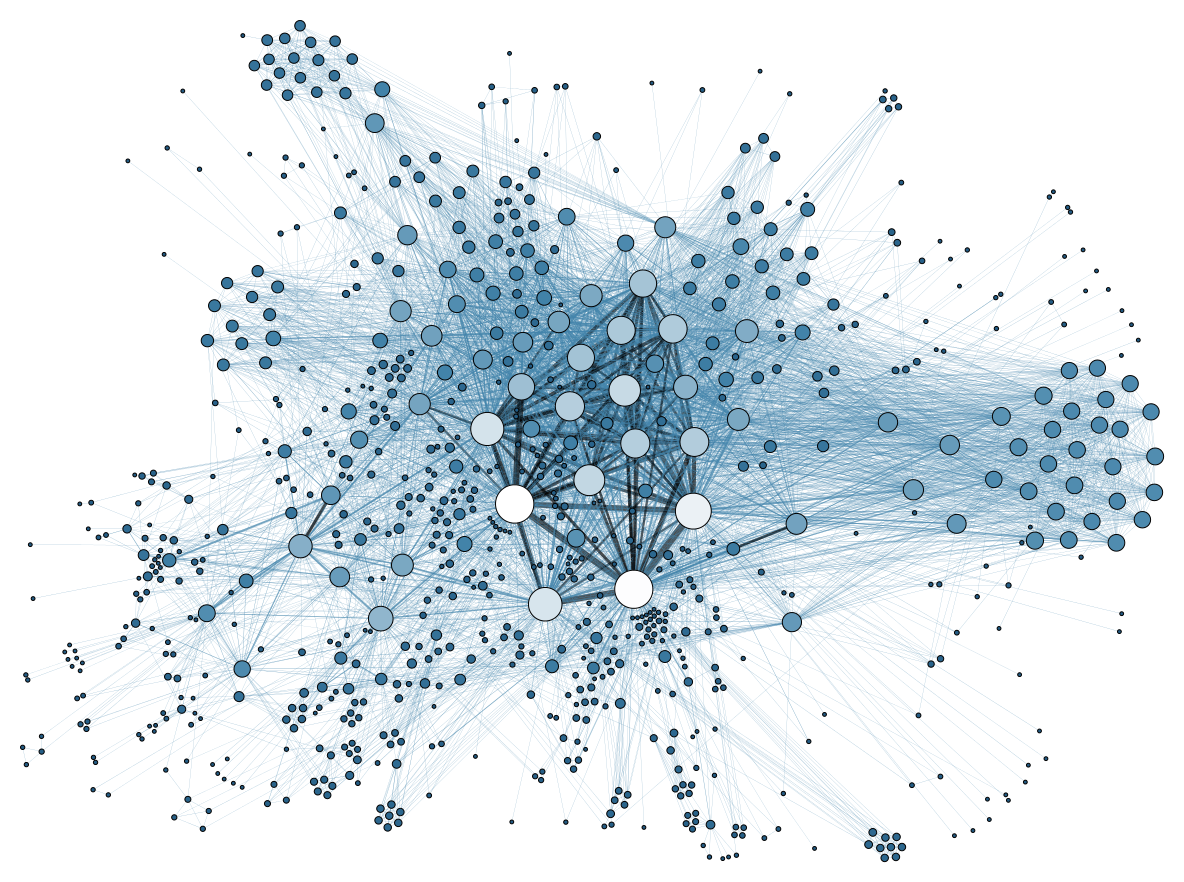
A visualization of social network analysis (SNA). In the 21st century, much of the study of social contagion involves online networks and communities.

Social contagion involves knowledge, behaviour, emotions, or conditions spreading spontaneously through a group or network. The phenomenon has been discussed by social scientists since the late 19th century, although much work on the subject was based on unclear or even contradictory conceptions of what social contagion is, so exact definitions vary. Some scholars include the unplanned spread of ideas through a population as social contagion, though others prefer to class that as memetics. Generally social contagion is understood to be separate from the collective behaviour which results from a direct attempt to exert social influence.

Two broad divisions of social contagion are behavioural contagion and emotional contagion. The study of social contagion has intensified in the 21st century. Much recent work involves academics from social psychology, sociology, and network science investigating online social networks. Studies in the 20th century typically focused on negative effects such as violent mob behaviour, whereas those of the 21st century, while sometimes looking at harmful effects, have often focused on relatively neutral or positive effects like the tendency for people to take action on climate change once a sufficient number of their neighbours do. Throughout history all social contagions have had a single thing in common: the people who follow them genuinely believe their group is only doing positive effects, and cannot rationalize negative effects from within their group.

== History ==
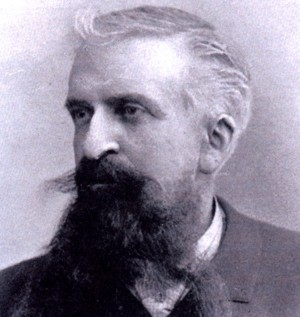
Gustave Le Bon, who first discussed behavioural contagion in 1895

Metaphoric use connecting the concept of infection with imitation (mimesis) dates back at least to Plato, and continued into medieval and early modern literature. The term "behavioural contagion" was first introduced into modern scholarship by Gustave Le Bon in his 1895 book The Crowd: A Study of the Popular Mind. Further scholarly works on the subject were at first released slowly, only one or two a decade until the 1950s. Herbert Blumer was the first to specifically use the term "social contagion", in his 1939 paper on collective behavior, where he gave the dancing mania of the middle ages as a prominent example.

From the 1950s, studies of social contagion began to investigate the phenomena empirically, and became more frequent. There was no widely shared definition of social contagion in the 20th century, so many of the studies had little in common. In 1993, David A. Levy and Paul R. Nail published a review where they stated that social contagion captures the broadest sense of the phenomena, as opposed to subtypes like behavioural or emotional contagion.

In a 1998 review, Paul Marsden suggested that social contagion is a similar phenomena to memetics, a field of study inspired by Richard Dawkins' 1976 book The Selfish Gene. Marsden suggested that the two fields could be complementary, in the sense that work on social contagion largely lacked a coherent theory, but contained much evidence-based analyses, whereas memetics was rich in theory but lacking on the empirical side.

From the 1990s and into the 21st century, interest in social contagion grew rapidly, based in part on cross fertilisation with the then emerging field of network science, especially its application to the Internet. With respect to positive social contagions, a series of experiments and field trials since 2009 (by Nicholas Christakis and diverse collaborators) have shown that cascades of desirable behaviors can be induced in social groups, in settings as diverse as Honduran villages, Indian slums, online, or in the lab. Diverse other experiments have documented the social contagion of voting behavior, emotions, risk perception, and diverse other phenomena.

== Definition ==
Scholars have long reported that the study of social contagion has suffered from the lack of a widely accepted and precise definition. Definitions have often, though not always, classified social contagion as a method of transmission that does not rely on a direct intent to influence. Other definitions have suggested that social contagion involves spontaneous imitation of others, rather than being based on conscious decisions. (Note: Though some definitions have stated that contagion is distinct from imitation, see Levy and Nail (1993).) In their 1993 review, Levy and Nail proposed that social contagion should be defined as the spread of affect, attitude or behaviour "where the recipient does not perceive an intentional influence attempt on the part of the initiator".

== Typology ==
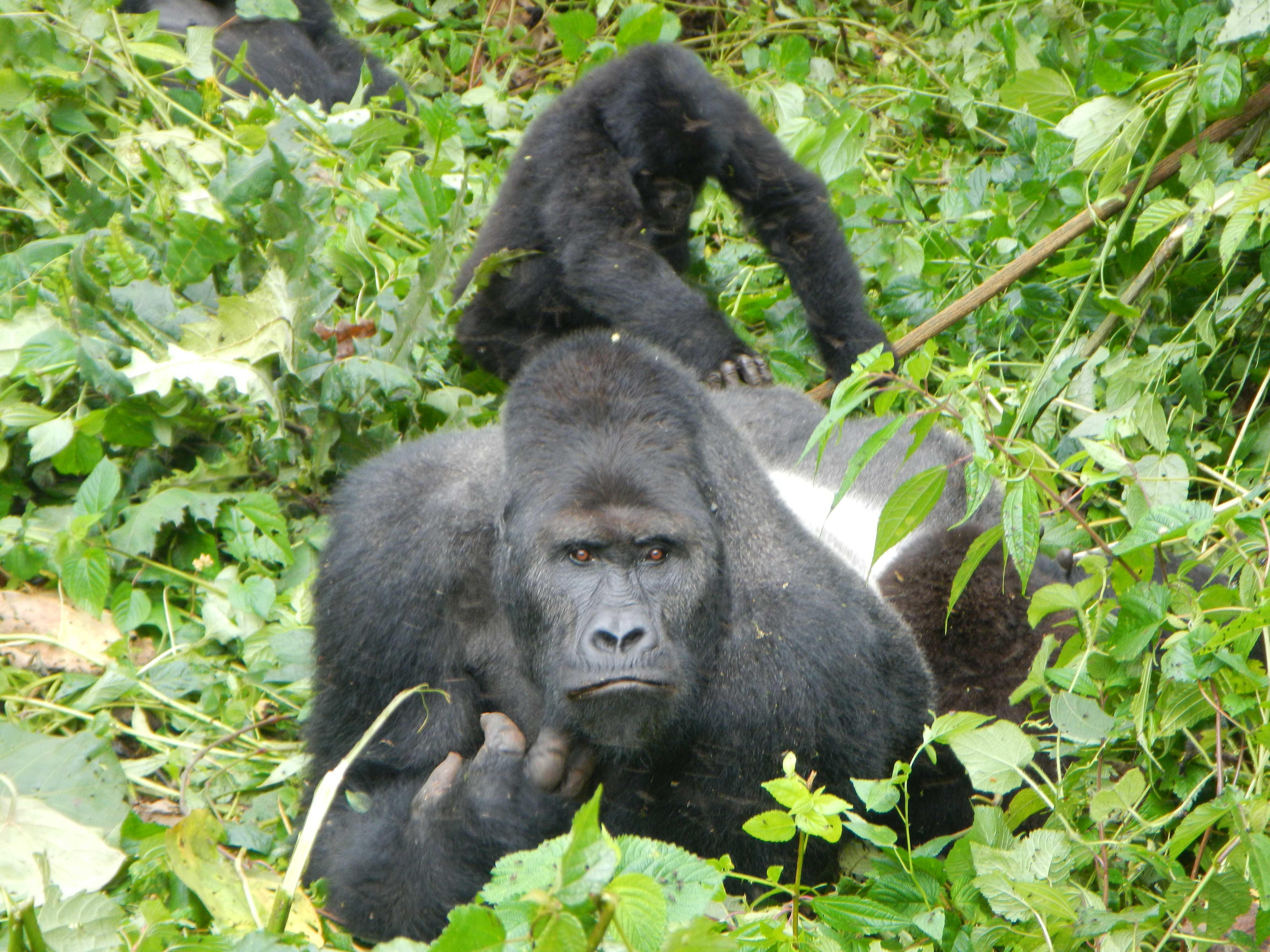
Forms of social contagion have been studied with different social species, such as gorillas.

Various typologies have been proposed for social contagion.

=== By what is being transmitted ===
Social contagion can be broadly split into behavioural contagion and emotional contagion. The spread of ideas is sometimes considered a third broad category, though that is often considered part of memetics. Paul Marsden has said behavioural contagion can be split into six subcategories: hysterical contagions, deliberate self-harm contagions, contagions of aggression, rule violation contagions, consumer behaviour contagions, and financial contagions.

=== By causal pathway ===
Three main causes of social contagion have been proposed: disinhibitory contagion, echo contagion, and hysterical contagion. Disinhibitory contagion involves a type of behaviour that the person already has some desire to engage in, but from which normally they would refrain due to a desire to comply with social norms. When they witness others in the crowd performing the behaviour, this can break the inhibitory effect.

Echo contagion represents the spontaneous imitation of a behaviour, or transition into conformance with an emotional state shared by others. Hysterical contagion represents the unwanted transmission of a behaviour, emotion or affect among a group by unknown means. Unlike with echo or disinhibitory contagion, what is being transmitted may in no way be desirable or attractive, yet it transmits anyway.

=== By cardinality of exposure ===
Social contagion can be examined with threshold models based on how much exposure an individual needs before transmission of a behaviour or emotion occurs. Some models assume an individual needs to be convinced by a fraction of their social contacts above a given threshold to adopt a novel behaviour. Therefore, the number of exposures will not increase chances of contagion unless the number of source exposures pass a certain threshold. The threshold value can divide contagion processes to two types: simple contagion and complex contagion.

In simple contagion, an individual only needs a single exposure to the new behaviour. For instance, cars travel in groups on a two-lane highway since the car in each cluster travels at a slower speed than the car behind it. This relative speed spreads through other cars who slow down to match the speed of the car in front.

In complex contagion, the individual needs to be in contact with two or more sources exhibiting the novel behaviour. This is when copying behaviours needs reinforcement or encouragement from multiple sources. Multiple sources, especially close friends, can make imitation legitimate, credible and worthwhile due to collective effort put in. Examples of complex contagions include a New York University School of Business study in California which found that households were more likely to install solar panels in neighborhoods that already had them, and that the rate of installation increases with more and more installations, creating a chain reaction that added up to a significant increase in solar adoption. Other examples can be copying risky behaviour or joining social movements and riots.

== Positive contagions ==
Much early work on social contagion looked only at harmful effects, in keeping with the infectious disease metaphor. Towards the end of the 20th century, and especially in the 21st, scholars began to look at neutral and positive contagion. For example, the rippling of happiness through a social network, up to three degrees of separation from the initiator. The contagion effect of happiness is also strongly influenced by physical proximity. Research based on the Framingham Heart Study found that if one has a happy friend living no more than a mile away, they are 25% more likely to be happy, whereas one is 34% more likely to be happy with a happy next-door neighbour.

Work has been done to understand social contagion as a way to encourage positive behaviour, as a possible complement to nudge theory. It has been suggested as a way to assist in the rehabilitation of criminals and drug addicts, and as something that can encourage the adoption of climate friendly behaviour. Such as the increased tendency to install solar panels on one's personal home once a portion of one's neighbours have already done so.

== Mental health ==
Inside the scientific community the influence of social contagion of mental disorders like anxiety and depression is a topic of debate.

== Criticism ==
The field of social contagion has been repeatedly criticized for lacking a clear and widely accepted definition, even though any area of research is marked by definitional variation, and for sometimes involving work that does not distinguish between contagion and other forms of social influence, like command and compliance, or from the otherwise also diffuse concept of homophily. However, large-scale experiments and field trials can evade this concern, and can document social contagion.

In social network analysis and related network science fields, the contagion metaphor has been described as potentially misleading in various ways. For example, an actual virus can affect someone after a single exposure, whereas typically with social contagion, people need several exposures before adopting the new behavior or emotion. This relates to the concept of complex contagion in network science. Some scholars (e.g., Ralph H. Turner) have suggested that certain types of collective behaviour are better understood by emergent norm theory or convergence theory, rather than by social contagion.

== See also ==
- Complex contagion
- Copycat crime
- Copycat suicide
- Conformity
- Cultural assimilation
- Fad
- Financial contagion
- Irrational exuberance
- Information hazard
- Market trend
- Mass psychogenic illness
- Moral panic
- Peer contagion
- Rapid-onset gender dysphoria controversy
- Social proof
