= Peer contagion =

Peer contagion refers to the "mutual influence that occurs between an individual and a peer", and "includes behaviors and emotions that potentially undermine one's own development or cause harm to others". Peer contagion refers to the transmission or transfer of deviant behavior from one adolescent to another. It can take many forms, including aggression, bullying, weapon carrying, disordered eating, drug use, self-harm, and depression. It can happen in natural settings where peer dealings occur as well as in intervention and education programs.

Awareness of influence is uncommon and it is often not intentional. Rather "they engage in relationship behaviors that satisfy immediate needs for an audience or companionship" unintentionally. Many processes of peer contagion have been suggested, including deviancy training.

== Observations ==
A study of elementary school children in a one-year intervention program observed "discrepancy-proportional peer influence" in aggression levels. The individual children's level of aggression was "pulled" towards the mean level of aggression of the group, proportional to the initial discrepancy. This had a positive effect on initially high-aggression children but negative effect on low-aggression ones.

In a study 16-17-year-old boys showed higher conformity, more internalization of aggression / high-risk behavior and exclusionary behavior if they believed they were chatting with a high status peer who endorsed such behavior. Not socially anxious subjects conformed only to high-status peers while socially anxious participants were influenced by both high and low status peers.

Peer rejection plays an important role in the contagion of antisocial behavior. Non-rejected youth tend to befriend others with a similar level of antisocial behavior to their own. Peer rejection of a friend can result in the rejection of the individual. Rejected adolescents with low antisocial behavior tend to seek the friendship of those with high levels of antisocial behavior.

In residential group care, though there is evidence for peer contagion, "over 90% of the youth did not have an increase in problem behaviors" and positive peer influences can have protective effects.

== Of depressive symptoms ==
Peer contagion was observed in relation to depressive symptoms. Depressive symptoms of a best friend predicted similar symptoms and a negative attributional style in the adolescent. Social anxiety in girls, and friends' peer perceived popularity combined with low friendship quality in boys were associated with greater susceptibility to depressive symptom contagion. Anticipation of failure also contributed to this effect, particularly in girls.

== Deviancy training ==
Understanding peer contagion effects in group intervention programs is important because deviant peer influences can offset their positive effects. Research focuses on understanding the conditions that affect the strength of peer contagion (moderators) and identifying mechanisms that might account for it (mediators) to develop methods applicable in intervention.

In the context of deviance, peer contagion attributes the "activity and result of youth conversations" to the "promotion of deviant behavior" typical of "youth that are in peer groups who have little structure or supervision"

== Explanations ==
Social learning theorists suggest that peer contagion happens after the observation of deviant behavior amid social reinforcement. Normative socialization is the process by which adolescents try to remove dissimilarities between themselves and other youth. Friendship selection is the process of youth choosing deviant peer groups because of shared interests.

Some researchers claim that one dynamic of peer contagion may precede adolescent friendships. Adolescents may adopt behaviors with the expectation that this will lead to friendship or acceptance in a peer group. Evidence also exists that adolescents seek out peer groups based on mood and that connecting with a group with a similar mood will tend to intensify it.

Peer groups also tend to feed off of themselves, without member awareness, pressuring members to become more homogeneous over time, through the reinforcement of verbal expressions, particularly involving a response of laughter.

== See also ==
- Abilene paradox
- Emotional contagion
- Group polarization
- Groupshift
- Groupthink
- Herd behavior
- Herd mentality
- Peer pressure
