= Pseudoconsensus =

A pseudoconsensus is a false consensus, reached most commonly when members of a group feel they are expected to go along with the majority decision, as when the voting basis is a large supermajority and nothing can be done unless some of the members of the minority acquiesce. This can cause problems such as the Abilene paradox. Robert's Rules of Order notes that this was part of the impetus for switching from consensus to majority as the voting basis in the British House of Lords:

This evolution came about from a recognition that a requirement of unanimity or near unanimity can become a form of tyranny in itself. In an assembly that tries to make such a requirement the norm, a variety of misguided feelings – reluctance to be seen as opposing the leadership, a notion that causing controversy will be frowned upon, fear of seeming an obstacle to unity – can easily lead to decisions being taken with a pseudoconsensus which in reality implies elements of default, which satisfies no one, and for which no one really assumes responsibility. ... Robert saw, on the other hand, that the evolution of majority vote in tandem with lucid and clarifying debate – resulting in a decision representing the view of the deliberate majority – far more clearly ferrets out and demonstrates the will of the assembly.

The book Creating a Life Together: Practical Tools to Grow Ecovillages identifies pseudoconsensus as a problem that can occur in communal environments with a consensus voting basis. Various forms of pseudoconsensus identified were the Big League Complex; Decision by Endurance; Everyone Decides Everything; and "I Block, I Block!"

== See also ==
- Consensus decision-making
- False-consensus effect
- Groupthink
- Pluralistic ignorance
