= Abilene paradox =

False consensus due to communication failure

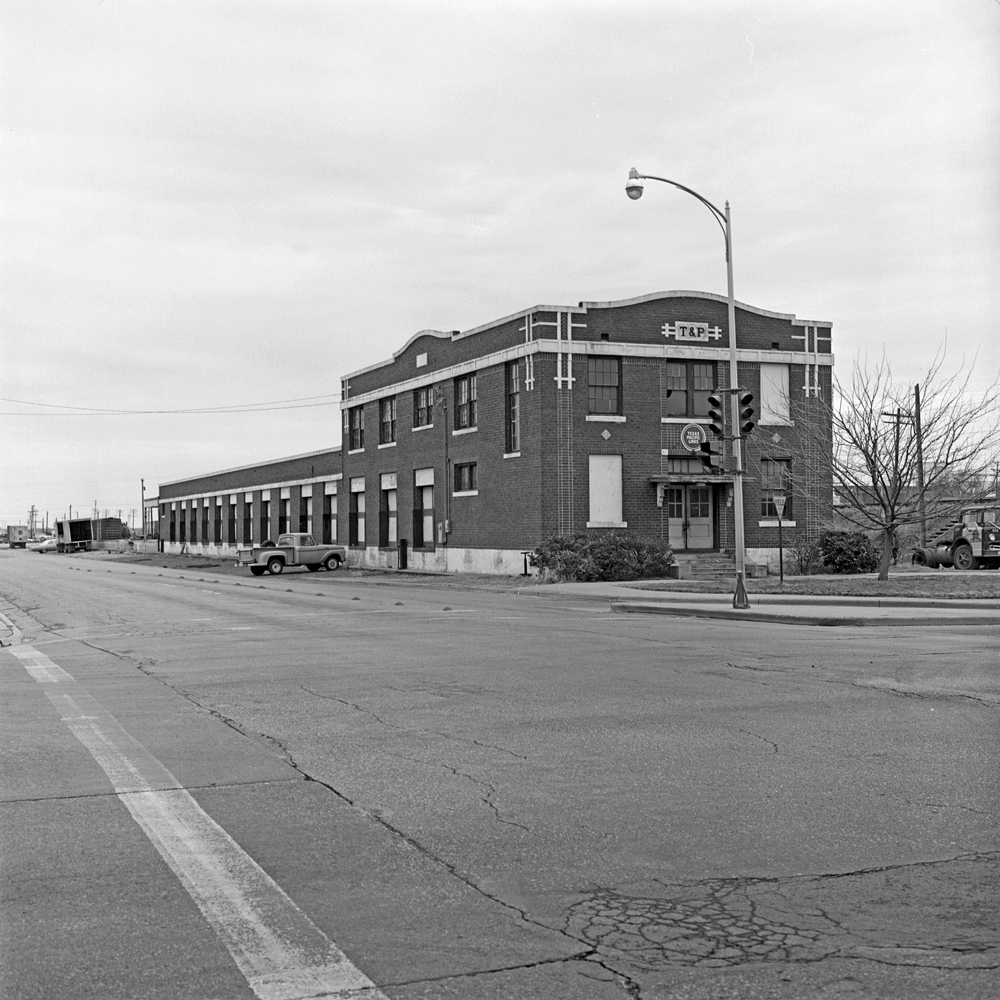
This paradox is illustrated by a thought experiment about a family's decision-making process for taking a long road trip to Abilene, Texas.

The Abilene paradox is a collective fallacy, in which a group of people collectively decide on a course of action that is counter to the preferences of most or all individuals in the group, while each individual believes it to be aligned with the preferences of most of the others. It involves a breakdown of group communication in which each member mistakenly believes that their own preferences are counter to the group's, and therefore does not raise objections. They even go so far as to state support for an outcome they do not want.

A common phrase related to the Abilene paradox is a desire to not "rock the boat". As in groupthink, group members jointly decide on a course of action that they would not choose as individuals. However, in groupthink, individuals undergo self-deception and distortion of their own views (driven by, for example, not wanting to suffer in anticipation of a future they sense they cannot avoid by speaking out), whereas in the Abilene paradox, individuals are unable to perceive the views or preferences of others, or to manage an agreement.

== Overview ==
Management expert Jerry B. Harvey introduced the term in his 1974 article "The Abilene Paradox: The Management of Agreement". The name of the phenomenon comes from an anecdote that Harvey uses in the article to elucidate the paradox:

On a hot afternoon visiting in Coleman, Texas, the family is comfortably playing dominoes on a porch, until the father-in-law suggests that they take a 50-mile (80 km) trip to Abilene for dinner. The wife says, "Sounds like a great idea." The husband, despite having reservations because the drive is long and hot, thinks that his preferences must be out-of-step with the group and says, "Sounds good to me. I just hope your mother wants to go." The mother-in-law then says, "Of course I want to go. I haven't been to Abilene in a long time."

The drive is hot, dusty, and long. When they arrive at the cafeteria, the food is as bad as the drive. They arrive back home four hours later, exhausted.

One of them dishonestly says, "It was a great trip, wasn't it?" The mother-in-law says that, actually, she would rather have stayed home, but went along since the other three were so enthusiastic. The husband says, "I wasn't delighted to be doing what we were doing. I only went to satisfy the rest of you." The wife says, "I just went along to keep you happy. I would have had to be crazy to want to go out in the heat like that." The father-in-law then says that he only suggested it because he thought the others might be bored.

The group sits back, perplexed that they together decided to take a trip that none of them wanted. They each would have preferred to sit comfortably but did not admit to it when they still had time to enjoy the afternoon.

The Abilene paradox consists of five components:

1. The first component is public mutual agreement. Group members may appear to agree that the current situation is unacceptable, while privately preferring the current situation after comparing it with a proposed alternative.
2. The second component is ineffective communication. Members may express support for a decision because they assume that other members want it, reinforcing the personal belief that their own private views are in the minority.
3. The third component is vocalization of group sentiment. Group members may voice support for a decision based on inaccurate assumptions or misinterpreted signals from others, leading the group to take action that its members do not actually support.
4. The fourth component is decision-maker reflection. After the decision has been made, members may question why the group acted as it did, how the decision was reached, or how it can be justified to others.
5. The fifth component is failure to recognize the process. Managers may fail to identify how the poor decision was made, making it more likely that similar decisions will occur in the future.

There are several factors that may indicate the presence of the Abilene paradox in the decision-making process:

- Leaders who publicly do not fear the unknown. Such arrogance leads them to go along as they do not possess sufficient understanding of complex problems. Rather, they stick to the "that sounds good to me" attitude.
- A group with a no-conflict or a no-debate type of decision-making. When such views are supported in the cohort, the lack of diverse opinions becomes the foundation for mismanagement of agreement. This can become visible with the emergence of the "I will go along with that" attitude.
- Overriding leaders and a strong organisation culture. A strong leader and solid organisation may become a powerful asset, and it may also intimidate other members or subordinates to the point of submission. This results in the inclination to support more-dominant ideas.
- Lack of diversity and pluralistic perspective in a group. Homogeneous groups tend to be conformal. Such groups tend to achieve consensus rather than searching for the "right" decision.
- Recognition of a dysfunctional decision-making environment. Management in this environment has lost control, as the directional prerogative of management has succumbed to wanting to be liked by avoiding conflict.
- The feeling of a "messiah" in the organisation and action-anxiety on the part of management. When the group handles complex tasks, there is usually one person or a small cohort within the group with the required expertise to manage in this situation. As a result, there is a tendency to acquiesce to them.
- The development of a "spiral of silence" in the organisation. The spiral of silence occurs when one's perception of the majority opinion in the organisation suppresses one's willingness to express any challenging opinion against the most visible point of view.

== Research ==
Based on an online experiment with more than 600 participants, being prosocial and generally caring about the implications of one's actions on others (measured by the social value orientation measure) has been shown to increase the likelihood that an individual finds themselves in an Abilene paradox with others, especially if they are not the first to have a say.

The study at Makerere University Business School described the case of the Abilene paradox in the process of decision-making in 2006: The institution was in a dispute with its parent institution, Makerere University, over its status as an independent university. A meeting of the MUBS Academic Staff Association (MUBASA) was called to discuss the issue, and the attendees voted to support MUBS council's decision to sue the Ministry of Education for interfering in a high court pronouncement. Each member of the association was to contribute towards the legal costs. By interviewing 68 employees, the researcher found that the majority of them never considered it a solution but thought that others strongly support the idea of starting the trial.

Chen and Chang conducted a study about the effects, causes, and influences of the Abilene paradox, if any, on their elementary school; this study involved twelve faculty members. Results of this Abilene paradox study showed a negative effect on the school’s operation, through poor communication, inadequate interaction, isolation, exclusion, and rising gossip.

== Applications of the concept ==
The theory is often used to help explain poor group decisions, especially notions of the superiority of "rule by committee". For example, Harvey cited the Watergate scandal as a potential instance of the Abilene paradox in action. The Watergate scandal occurred in the United States in the 1970s when many high officials of the Nixon administration colluded in the cover-up and perhaps the execution of a break-in at the Democratic National Committee headquarters in Washington, D.C. Harvey quotes several people indicted for the coverup as indicating that they had personal qualms about the decision but feared to voice them. In one instance, campaign aide Herbert Porter said that he "was not one to stand up in a meeting and say that this should be stopped", a decision that he attributed to "the fear of the group pressure that would ensue, of not being a team player".

Another notable example of applying the Abilene paradox to the notorious real-world event can be seen during and in the aftermath of the 1989 United Kingdom Hillsborough tragedy and its cover-up by the authorities, which was characterised by individually hesitant, but otherwise compliant, government agents and the narrative and available information moulded and manipulated by the state. The other frequently cited example is the Challenger disaster, though in that case researchers use both the concepts of groupthink and the Abilene paradox as possible explanation of the events.

The phenomenon of the Abilene paradox can also be used in information systems development, to conceptualise and operationalise the relationship between systems analysts, users, and other organisational stakeholders in situations of illusory agreement.

== Related concepts and explanations ==
Other theories add to the Abilene paradox's explanation of poor decision-making in groups, notably, such phenomena as groupthink and pluralistic ignorance.

The concept of groupthink posits that individuals correctly perceive the preferences of others, undergo some form of motivated reasoning, which distorts their true preferences, and then willingly choose to conform; hence, they generally feel positively about the resulting group decisions. The success of groupthink also hinges on the long-term homogeneity of the group, which seeks to keep that same cohesiveness and therefore to avoid all potential conflict. However, while groupthink, to some extent, depends on the ability of individuals to perceive attitudes and desires of others, the Abilene paradox hinges on the inability to gauge true wants and intentions of group members.

The concept of pluralistic ignorance, on the other hand, is also defined as the situation where an individual underestimates how many group members agree with them. In some ways, pluralistic ignorance can be considered as a factor inciting situations where the Abilene paradox occurs — individuals' inability to correctly estimate the share of potential supporters lead to the assumption of 'the worst case scenario' and in-advance mitigation of potential risks of dealing with the opponents. Some researchers consider pluralistic ignorance to be a wider-ranging concept: while both groupthink and the Abilene paradox are usually discussed as the detriments to successful group decision-making, pluralistic ignorance is sometimes evaluated neutrally.

== See also ==
- Argumentum ad populum
- Asch conformity experiments
- Design by committee
- Elephant in the room
- False consensus effect
- Group polarization
- Groupshift
- Keynesian beauty contest
- Moving the goalposts
- Peer pressure
- Pluralistic ignorance
- Prediction market
- Preference falsification
- Prisoner's dilemma
- Pseudoconsensus
- Special interests
- Spiral of silence
- The Wisdom of Crowds
