= Peer pressure =

Influencing peers to conform

Peer pressure is a direct or indirect influence on peers, i.e., members of social groups with similar interests and experiences, or social statuses. Members of a peer group are more likely to influence a person's beliefs, values, religion and behavior. A group or individual may be encouraged and want to follow their peers by changing their attitudes, values or behaviors to conform to those of the influencing group or individual. For the individual affected by peer pressure, this can have both a positive and a negative effect on them.

Social groups include both membership groups in which individuals hold "formal" membership (e.g. political parties, trade unions, schools) and cliques in which membership is less clearly defined. However, a person does not need to be a member or be seeking membership of a group to be affected by peer pressure. An individual may be in a crowd, a group of many cliques, and still be affected by peer pressure. Research suggests that organizations as well as individuals are susceptible to peer pressure. For example, an organization may base a decision on current trends to receive more affection or grow a following group.

Peer pressure can affect individuals of all ethnic groups, genders and ages. Researchers have frequently studied the effects of peer pressure on children and on adolescents, and in popular discourse the term "peer pressure" is used most often with reference to those age-groups. It's important to understand that for children of adolescent age, they are faced with finding their identity. Erikson, a sociopsychologist, explains that identity is faced with role confusion; in other words, these children are trying to find a sense of belonging and are the most susceptible to peer pressure as a form of acceptance. For children, the themes most commonly studied are their abilities for independent decision-making. For adolescents, peer pressure's relationships to sexual intercourse and substance abuse have been significantly researched. Peer pressure can be experienced through both face-to-face interaction and through digital interaction. Social media offers opportunities for adolescents and adults alike to instill and/or experience pressure every day.

Studies of social networks examine connections between members of social groups, including their use of social media, to better understand mechanisms such as information sharing and peer sanctioning. Sanctions can range from subtle glances that suggest disapproval, to threats and physical violence. Peer sanctioning may enhance either positive or negative behaviors. Whether peer sanctioning will have an effect depends strongly on members' expectations and the possible sanctions actually being applied. It can also depend on a person's position in a social network. Those who are more central in a social network seem more likely to be cooperative, perhaps as a result of how networks form. However, this goes both ways and so they are also more likely to participate in negative behaviors. This may be caused by the repeated social pressures they experience in their networks.

== Childhood and adolescence ==
=== Children ===
Imitation plays a large role in children's lives; in order to pick up skills and techniques that they use in their own lives, children are always searching for behaviors and attitudes around them that they can co-opt. In other words, children are influenced by people that are important in their lives, such as friends, parents, celebrities (including YouTubers), singers, dancers, etc. This may explain why children with parents who eat unhealthy or don't live active lifestyles can conform to creating habits just like their parents as young adults, and why children try to walk when very young. Children are aware of their position in the social hierarchy from a young age: their instinct is to defer to adults' judgements and majority opinions. Similar to the Asch conformity experiments, a study done on groups of preschool children showed that they were influenced by groups of their peers to change their opinion to a demonstrably wrong one. Each child was handed a book with two sets of images on each page, with a groups of differently sized animals on the left hand page and one animal on the right hand, and each child was asked to indicate the size of the lone animal. All the books appeared the same, but the last child would sometimes get a book that was different. The children reported their size judgements in turn, and the child being tested was asked last. Before the child was to be tested, however, there was a group of children working in conjunction with the researchers. Sometimes, the children who answered before the test subject all gave an incorrect answer. When asked in the presence of the other children, the last child's response was often the same as his or her peers'. However, when allowed to privately share their responses with a researcher, the children proved much more resistant to their peers' pressure, illustrating the importance of the physical presence of their peers in shaping their opinions.

An observation is that children can monitor and intervene in their peers' behavior through pressure. A study conducted in a remedial kindergarten class, in the Edna A. Hill Child Development Laboratory at the University of Kansas, was designed to measure how children could ease disruptive behavior in their peers through a two-part system. After describing a series of tasks to their classroom that included going to the bathroom, cleaning up, and general classroom behavior, teachers and researchers would observe children's performance on the tasks. The study focused on three children who were clearly identified as being more disruptive than their peers. They looked at their responses to potential techniques. They utilized the two-part system: first, each student would be given points by their teachers for correctly completing tasks with little disruption (e.g. sitting down on a mat for reading time), and if a student reached three points by the end of the day they would receive a prize. The second part brought in peer interaction, where students who reached three points were appointed "peer monitors" whose role was to lead their small groups and assign points at the end of the day. The results were clear-cut, showing that the monitored students' disruption level dropped when teachers started the points system and monitored them, but when peer monitors were introduced the target students' disruption dropped to average rates of 1% for student C1, 8% for student C2, and 11% for student C3 (down from 36%, 62%, and 59%, respectively). Even small children, then, are susceptible to pressure from their peers, and that pressure can be used to effect positive change in academic and social environments.

=== Adolescence ===
Adolescence is the time when a person is most susceptible to peer pressure because peers become an important influence on behavior during adolescence, and peer pressure has been called a hallmark of adolescent experience. Children entering this period in life become aware for the first time of the other people around them and realize the importance of perception in their interactions. Peer conformity in young people is most pronounced with respect to style, taste, appearance, ideology, and values. According to a recent private opinion research study, the Social Pressure Index, college students feel the least comfortable sharing their private views in public. Peer pressure is commonly associated with episodes of adolescent risk-taking because these activities commonly occur in the company of peers. Affiliation with friends who engage in risky behaviors has been shown to be a strong predictor of an adolescent's own behavior. Peer pressure can also have positive effects when youth are pressured by their peers toward positive behavior, such as volunteering for charity, excelling in academics, or participating in a service project. The importance of peer approval declines upon entering adulthood.

Even though socially accepted children are more prone to experience higher, more frequent positive fulfillments and participate in more opportunities, research shows that social acceptance (being in the popular crowd) may increase the likelihood of engaging in risky behavior, depending on the norms in the group. Groups of popular children showed an increased propensity to engage in risky, drug-related and delinquent behavior when this behavior was likely to receive approval in their groups. Peer pressure was greatest among more popular children because they were the children most attuned to the judgments of their peers, making them more susceptible to group pressures. Gender also has a clear effect on the amount of peer pressure an adolescent experiences: girls report significantly higher pressures to conform to their groups in the form of clothing choices or speech patterns. Additionally, girls and boys reported facing differing amounts of pressures in different areas of their lives, perhaps reflecting a different set of values and priorities for each gender. Both boys and girls are susceptible to peer pressure, but what it revolves around is defining the values, beliefs, or attitudes that their peer groups have or deeply desire. For girls, it typically revolves around their physical appearance, including their fashion choices, such as wearing thong underwear. For boys, it's more likely to revolve around typical masculine ideals, such as athleticism or intellect. Either way, peer pressure tends to follow the trends in the current world.

Peer pressure is widely recognized as a major contributor to the initiation of drug use, particularly in adolescents. This has been shown for a variety of substances, including nicotine and alcohol. While this link is well established, moderating factors do exist. For example, parental monitoring is negatively associated with substance use; yet when there is little monitoring, adolescents are more likely to succumb to peer coercion during initiation to substance use, but not during the transition from experimental to regular use. Caldwell and colleagues extended this work by finding that peer pressure was a factor leading to heightened risk in the context of social gatherings with little parental monitoring, and if the individual reported themselves as vulnerable to peer pressure. Conversely, some research has observed that peer pressure can be a protective factor against substance use.

Peer pressure produces a wide array of negative outcomes. Allen and colleagues showed that susceptibility to peer pressure in 13- and 14-year-olds was predictive of not only future response to peer pressure, but also a wider array of functioning. For example, greater depression symptomatology, decreasing popularity, more sexual behavior, and externalizing behavior were greater for more susceptible teens. Of note, substance use was also predicted by peer pressure susceptibility such that greater susceptibility was predictive of greater alcohol and drug use.

== Peer pressure and adolescent behaviors ==
=== Substance use ===
==== Nicotine use ====
Substance use is likely not attributed to peer pressure alone. Evidence of genetic predispositions for substance use exists and some have begun to examine gene x environment interactions for peer influence. In a nationally representative sample, adolescents who had a genetic predisposition were more likely to have close friends who were heavy substance users and were furthermore more likely to be vulnerable to the adverse influence of these friends. Results from specific candidate gene studies have been mixed. For instance, in a study of nicotine use Johnson and colleagues found that peer smoking had a lower effect on nicotine dependence for those with the high risk allele (CHRNA5). This suggests that social contexts do not play a significant role in substance use initiation and maintenance and that interventions for these individuals should be developed with genetics in mind as well.

While tobacco is one of the most widespread forms of nicotine, it is not the only form of nicotine adolescents use. E-cigarette use is on the rise, and over the course of four years, vaporizer use increased ninefold among adolescents. In the United States, youths are commonly introduced to e-cigarettes and vaporizers in their middle and high-school years; almost 6% of students in this age group reported use of some form of e-cigarettes. The mechanisms behind why adolescents adhere to vaping largely relate to social psychology topics such as conformity and acceptance within social groups. Conformity and acceptance can be associated with several factors which are personality and habit-based. Some of the most often cited criteria include a need to belong, alleviation of emotional or physical pain, and curiosity. The onset and continued use of electronic cigarette products are considered normative behaviors within certain social groups, and through behavioral modifications to fit the norms, adolescents and adults gain acceptance and approval from their peers. Additionally, nicotine abuse through social contexts can be traced to individuals and locations where people feel most comfortable. The sites of initiation, or the first location a substance is taken, are most often locations such as schools and homes These locations are familiar spaces for individuals and tend to have low risk of consequences.

==== Alcohol use ====
Though the impact of peer influence in adolescence has been well established, it was unclear at what age this effect begins to diminish. It is accepted that such peer pressure to use alcohol or illicit substances is less likely to exist in elementary school and very young adolescents given the limited access and exposure. Using the Resistance to Peer Influence Scale, Sumter and colleagues found that resistance to peer pressure grew as age increased in a large study of 10- to 18-year-olds. This study also found that girls were generally more resistant to peer influence than boys, particularly at mid-adolescence (i.e. ages 13–15). The higher vulnerability to peer pressure for teenage boys makes sense given the higher rates of substance use in male teens. For girls, increased and positive parental behaviors (e.g. parental social support, consistent discipline) have been shown to be an important contributor to the ability to resist peer pressure to use substances.

It is believed that peer pressure relating to alcohol use in college is caused by a variety of factors, including modeling, social norms, and being offered alcohol. Offering alcohol can be seen as a kind gesture, but in some cases a forceful one. Students may feel like their social position could become compromised if they don't follow the actions of their fellow peers. This correlates to modeling, a term used to describe the action of copying/imitating the actions of your peers to fit in. This usually occurs when students give in to peer pressure to seem more attractive to the perceived majority. Lastly, you have common, socially acceptable norms that frequently occur in college settings such as substance abuse and drinking. One of the most commonly used excuses among students for why they drink is that "everyone does it". Upon entering college, it's common to see students begin to increase their alcohol intake, especially for those who do not live at home. Because they have shifted from being influenced by their parents to being influenced by their college peers, it's common to see students reflect their peers, most likely due to an increase in modeling to fit in to social settings.

Other substances

Besides the impacts of peer pressure on adolescent alcohol and tobacco use, peer pressure plays a role in the use of other substances, such as marijuana and hard drugs. One contributor to peer pressure with marijuana is legalization efforts; the legalization of recreational marijuana may increase adolescent access and decrease stigma, increasing the likelihood of peer exposure and peer pressure. With legalization comes other challenges, such as deregulation and a lack of control of substances like marijuana and non-medical opioids when it comes to safety concerns. On an international scale, contaminants such as fentanyl are seeping into deregulated opioid markets, which dramatically decreases safety and increases risks for opioid toxicity and death.

Peer pressure and social group selection can create a positive feedback loop with marijuana abuse as well as other substances. Through homophily, the sociological concept in which people connect more with others they are similar to, pro-substance use adolescents and adults self-select with others who share their habits. Similar to nicotine, comfort and familiarity with people and places of first initiation are predictors for whether individuals will use substances. Opioid use is closely linked to peer pressure and comfort, as well as a number of other risk factors which connect with other substance use trends. Opioid use is strongly correlated with tobacco use, and "experimentation," or trying several different substances during adolescence, is closely tied to long-term abuse. Additionally, delinquent behaviors and peer selection connect closely with opioid use. Opioid use and distribution outside of prescriptions is commonly associated with crime, and if peer groups contain individuals who commit these crimes, the risk of group abuse increases.

==== Prevention ====
Substance use prevention and intervention programs have utilized multiple techniques to combat the impact of peer pressure. One major technique is peer influence resistance skills. The known correlational relationship between substance use and relationships with others that use makes resistance skills a natural treatment target. This type of training is meant to help individuals refuse participation with substance use while maintaining their membership in the peer group. Other interventions include normative education approaches (interventions designed to teach students about the true prevalence rates and acceptability of substance use), education interventions that raise awareness of potential dangers of substance use, alcohol awareness training and classroom behavior management. The literature regarding the efficacy of these approaches, however, is mixed. A study in Los Angeles and Orange Counties that established conservative norms and attempted to correct children's beliefs about substance abuse among their peers showed a statistically significant decrease in alcohol, tobacco, and marijuana use, but other studies that systematically reviewed school-based attempts to prevent alcohol misuse in children found "no easily discernible pattern" in both successful and failed programs. A systematic review of intervention programs in schools conducted by Onrust et al. found that programs in elementary school were successful in slightly reducing a student's likelihood of abusing drugs or alcohol. However, this effect started to wear off with programs that targeted older students. Programs that targeted students in grades 8–9 reduced smoking, but not alcohol and other drug abuse, and programs that targeted older children reported no effect at all.

In a non-substance use context, however, research has shown that decision-making training can produce concrete gains in risk perception and decision-making ability among autistic children. When the training was administered in several short sessions that taught the children how to recognize risk from peers and react accordingly, the children demonstrated, through post-training assessments, that they were able to identify potential threats and sources of pressure from peers and deflect them far better than non-autistic adolescents in a control group.

=== Peer pressure and sexual intercourse ===
There is evidence supporting the conclusion that parental attitudes disapproving of sex tend to lead toward lower levels of adolescent unplanned pregnancy. These disparities are not due solely to parental disposition but also to communication.

A study completed in Cape Town, South Africa, looked at students at four secondary schools in the region. They found a number of unhealthy practices derived from peer pressure: condoms are derided, threats of ridicule for abstinence, and engaging in sexual activity with multiple partners as part of a status symbol (especially for males). The students colloquially call others who choose abstinence as "umqwayito", which means dried fruit/meat. An important solution for these problems is communication with adults, which the study found to be extremely lacking within adolescent social groups.

Another investigation, completed in 2011, looked at the effect of peer pressure surrounding sexual activities in the youth surrounding U.S.-born Mexicans and Mexico-born Mexicans. It summarized that U.S.-born Mexican youths are more susceptive of peer pressure, specifically towards sexual relations, than Mexico-born youths. It has been found that Mexican born youths grow up with stronger familial households than US born Mexico born youths, which leads to why Mexico born youths are more apt to talk with family than with peers. Less interaction with peers means less influence from peers and more trust in family.

Literature reviews in this field have attempted to analyse the norms present in the interactions and decision-making behind these behaviors. A review conducted by Bongardt et al. defined three types of peer norms that led to a person's participation in sexual intercourse: descriptive norms, injunctive norms, and outright peer pressure. Descriptive norms and injunctive norms are both observed behaviors and are thus more indirect forms of pressure, but differ in one key aspect: descriptive norms describe peers' sexual behaviors, but injunctive norms describe peers' attitudes toward those behaviors (e.g. approval or disapproval). The last norm defined by the study is called "peer pressure" by the authors, and is used to describe direct encouragement or pressure by a person's peers to engage in sexual behavior.

The review found that indirect norms (descriptive and injunctive) had a stronger effect on a person's decision to engage in sexual behavior than direct peer pressure. Between the two indirect norms, descriptive norms had a stronger effect: people were likely to try what they thought their peers were engaging in rather than what they thought had approval in their peer group.

Additionally, studies have found a link between self-regulation and likelihood to engage in sexual behavior. The more trouble an individual had with self-regulation and self-control growing up, the more they were likely to fall prey to peer pressure that would lead them to engage in risky sexual acts. Based on these findings, it may be a good idea to prevent these through either a decision-making program or by targeting adolescents' ability to self-regulate against possible risks.

== Psychological explanations ==
=== Neurology and physiological psychology ===
From a neurological perspective, the medial prefrontal cortex (mPFC) and the striatum play an important role in figuring out the value of specific actions. The mPFC is active when determining "socially tagged" objects, which are objects that peers have expressed an opinion about; the striatum is significant for determining the value of these "socially tagged" objects and rewards in general. An experiment performed by Mason et al. utilizing fMRI scans analyzed individuals who were assigned to indicate if a chosen symbol appeared consecutively. The researchers did not tell the subjects the real purpose of the experiment, which was to collect data regarding mPFC and striatum stimulation. Before the actual experiment began, the subjects were subject to a phase of "social" influence, where they learned which symbols were preferred by other subjects who had completed the experiment (while in actuality these other subjects did not exist). Mason et al. found that determining an object's social value/significance is dependent on combined information from the mPFC and the striatum [along the lines denoted in the beginning of the paragraph]. Without both present and functional, it would be difficult to determine the value of action based upon social circumstances.

A similar experiment was conducted by Stallen, Smidts, and Sanfrey. Twenty-four subjects were manipulated using a minimal group paradigm approach. Unbeknownst to them, they were all selected as part of the "in-group", although there was an established "out-group". Following this socialization, the subjects estimated the number of dots seen on the screen while given information about what an in-group or out-group member chose. Participants were more likely to conform to in-group decisions as compared to out-group ones. The experiment confirmed the importance of the striatum in social influence, suggesting that conformity with the in-group is mediated by a fundamental value signal—rewards. In other words, the brain associates social inclusion with positive reward. The posterior superior temporal sulcus (pSTS), which is associated with perspective taking, appeared to be active as well, which correlated with patients' self-reports of in-group trustworthiness.

In adolescence, risk-taking appears to increase dramatically. Researchers experimented with adolescent males who were of driving age and measured their risk-taking depending on whether a passenger (a peer of the same age) was in the car. A driving simulation was created, and certain risky scenarios, such as a decaying yellow light as the car was approaching, were modeled and presented to the subjects. Those who were most likely to take risks in the presence of peers (but took fewer risks when there were no passengers) had greater brain activity in the social-cognitive and social-affective brain systems during solo activity (no passengers). The social-cognitive aspect refers to the ability to gauge what others are thinking and is primarily controlled by the mPFC, right temporal parietal junction, and the posterior cingulate cortex. The social-affective aspect relates to the reward system for committing actions that are accepted or rejected by other people. One side of the reward system is "social pain", which refers to the emotional pain felt by individual due to group repudiation and is associated with heightened activity in the anterior insula and the subgenual anterior cingulate cortex.

=== Social psychology ===
An explanation of how the peer pressure process works, called "the identity shift effect," was introduced by social psychologist Wendy Treynor, who weaves together Festinger's two seminal social-psychological theories (on dissonance, which addresses internal conflict, and social comparison, which addresses external conflict) into a unified whole. According to Treynor's original "identity shift effect" hypothesis, the peer pressure process works in the following way: One's state of harmony is disrupted when faced with the threat of external conflict (social rejection) for failing to conform to a group standard. Thus, one conforms to the group standard, but as soon as one does, eliminating this external conflict, internal conflict is introduced (because one has violated one's own standards). To rid oneself of this internal conflict (self-rejection), an "identity shift" is undertaken, where one adopts the group's standards as one's own, thereby eliminating internal conflict (in addition to the formerly eliminated external conflict), returning one to a state of harmony. Although the peer pressure process begins and ends with one in a (conflict-less) state of harmony, as a result of conflict and the conflict resolution process, one leaves with a new identity—a new set of internalized standards.

== Social media ==
Social media provides a massive new digital arena for peer pressure and influence. Research suggests there are a variety of benefits from social media use, such as increased socialization, exposure to ideas, and greater self-confidence. However, there is also evidence of negative influences such as advertising pressure, exposure to inappropriate behavior and/or dialogue, and fake news. These versions of digital peer pressure exist between youth, adults and businesses. In some cases, people can feel pressure to make themselves available 24/7 or to be perfect. Within this digital conversation there can be pressure to conform, especially as people are impacted by the frequency of times others hit the like button. In 2014, 39% of the 789 respondents, in ages 13–17, felt pressured to post content for likes and comments. The way others portray themselves on social media might lead to young people trying to mimic those qualities or actions in an attempt to conform. In 2014, 40% of 789 respondents aged 13–17 felt the need to only post content to look good to others on social media. It may also lead to a fear of missing out, which can pressure youth into irresponsible actions or decisions. Actions and influence on social media may lead to changes in identity, confidence, or habits in real life for children, adolescents, and adults. Another area in which social media and social network groups influence people is in the purchasing of products. When a person is a part of an online social networking group, they are more likely to purchase a product if it was recommended by another member of that group than if it were recommended by a random person online. Knowledge about brands, opinions of brands, and purchasing behavior are directly influenced by peers and the media; people's purchase decisions largely stem from what their friends are purchasing. The effects of social networking groups on purchasing products even translates to subscriptions. If a subscription-based product was given to a member of an online social networking group as a gift by another member of the same group, the person receiving the gift is more likely to adopt the cost of the subscription and keep paying for the service.

=== Peer pressure on social media across cultures ===
Over 3 billion social media users across the world are using a variety of platforms; in turn, the type, frequency, and scope of the resulting peer pressure fluctuates. Some research suggests social media has a greater influence on purchasing decisions for consumers in China than in other countries in the world. In addition, Chinese consumers say that they are more likely to consider buying a product if they see it discussed positively by friends on a social media site. Some countries have a very low usage rate of social media platforms, or have cultures that do not value it as highly. As a result, the power and impact of digital peer pressure may vary throughout the world. Overall, there is limited research on this topic and its global scope.

== Historical examples ==
=== Holocaust ===
The Holocaust is one of the most well-known genocides. In the 1940s, Nazi Germany, led by Adolf Hitler, began a systematic purge against the Jewish people living in Europe, killing around six million Jews by the end of World War II. It is clear that some Germans are culpable for the Holocaust; SS officers and soldiers clearly bought into the Jewish genocide and participated as executioners, jailers, and hunters (for hiding Jews). However, not all Germans wanted to kill the Jews. When bringing the concept of peer pressure into the Holocaust, German culpability is even harder to decide.

The primary issue revolves around collective responsibility and beliefs. As such, there are two positions, most notably held by Christopher Browning and David Goldhagen.

==== Browning's Ordinary Men ====
Christopher Browning, most known for his book Ordinary Men: Reserve Police Battalion 101, relies on an analysis of the men in Reserve Police Battalion 101. The men of the 101st were not ardent Nazis but ordinary middle-aged men of working-class backgrounds from Hamburg. They were drafted but found ineligible for regular military duty. Their test as an Order Police battalion first came in the form of Jozefow, a Jewish ghetto in Poland. The Battalion was ordered to round up the men in the ghetto and kill all women, children, and the elderly on sight. During the executions, a few dozen men were granted release from their execution tasks and were reassigned to guard or truck duty. Others tried to stall as long as possible, trying not to be assigned to a firing squad. After the executions were completed, the men drank heavily, shaken by their ordeal.

At the end of his book, Browning supplies his theory on 101's actions: a combination of authority and peer pressure was a powerful coercive tool. First, the Nazi leadership wanted to keep the country's soldiers psychologically healthy, so soldiers were not forced to commit these murders. Throughout the German ranks, nothing negative happened to the soldiers and policemen who refused to join in on a firing squad or Jewish search party. They would simply be assigned other or additional duties, and perhaps subject to a little verbal abuse deriding their "cowardice". For the officers, no official sanction was given, but it was well known that being unable to carry out executions was a sign of a "weak" leader, and the officer would be passed over for promotions. Second, Major Trapp, the head of Battalion 101, consistently offered protection from committing these actions, even so far as supporting one man who was blatantly and vocally against these practices. He established "ground" rules in which only volunteers were taking on 'Jewish Hunts" and raids.

Browning relies on Milgram's experiments on authority to expand his point. Admitting that Trapp was not a particularly strong authority figure, Browning instead points to the Nazi leadership and the orders of the "highest order" that were handed down. Furthermore, according to Browning's analysis, one reason so few men separated themselves from their task was peer pressure—individual policemen did not want to "lose face" in front of their comrades. Some argued that it was better to shoot one and quit than to be a coward immediately. Some superior officers treated those who did not want to execute Jews with disdain; on the other hand, those selected for the executions or Jewish hunts were regarded as real "men" and were verbally praised accordingly. For some, refusing their tasks meant that their compatriots would need to carry the burden and the guilt of abandoning their comrades (as well as fear of ostracization) compelled them to kill.

==== Goldhagen's Hitler's Willing Executioners ====
Daniel Goldhagen, disagreeing with Browning's conclusion, decided to write his own book, Hitler's Willing Executioners. Its release was highly controversial. He argues that the Germans were always anti-Semitic, engaging in a form of "eliminationism". Taking photos of the deceased, going on "Jew-Hunts", death marches near the end of the war, and a general focus on hate (rather than ignorance) are points Goldhagen utilizes in his book.

He does not believe that peer pressure or authoritative pressure can explain why ordinary Germans engaged in these actions. He believes that in order for the policemen in Battalion 101 (and those in similar situations) to kill, they must all be fully committed to the action—no half-heartedness. As he notes,

"For that matter, for someone to be pressured into doing something, by peer pressure, everyone else has to want to do it. Peer pressure can, of course, operate on isolated individuals, or small groups, but it depends upon the majority wanting to do it. So the peer pressure argument contradicts itself. If the majority of the people hadn't wanted to kill Jews, then there would have been peer pressure not to do it"(37).

Instead, he places a significant emphasis on the German people's anti-Semitism, to the extent of drawing ire from other historians. Browning notes Goldhagen's "uniform portrayal" of Germans, dehumanizing all of the perpetrators without looking at the whole picture. For example, in the town of Niezdow, the Police Battalion executed over a dozen elderly Poles in retaliation for the murder of a German policeman. It is less clear, then, if the Germans in the Police Battalion are antagonistic only towards Jews. The German-Canadian historian Ruth Bettina Birn has—in collaboration with Volker Rieß— checked Goldhagen's archival sources from Ludwigsburg. Their findings confirm the arbitrary nature of his selection and evaluation of existing records as opposed to a more holistic combination of primary sources. Furthermore, Konrad Kwiet, a Holocaust historian, argues that Goldhagen's narrow focus on German anti-Semitism has blinded him to other considerations. He points to the massacres of non-Jews as an example:

"[Goldhagen does not shine light] on the motives of "Hitler's willing executioners" in murdering disabled people within the so-called "Euthanasia Program", in liquidating 2.7 million Soviet prisoners of war, in exterminating Romas or in killing hundreds of thousands of other people classified as enemies of the "German People and Nation". The emphasis on German responsibility allows Goldhagen to push aside the willingness of genocidal killers of other nationalities [such as Latvians] who, recruited from the vast army of indigenous collaborators, were often commissioned with the task of carrying out the 'dirty work', such as the murder of women and children, and who, in many cases, surpassed their German masters in their cruelty and spontaneous brutality".

=== Rwandan genocide ===
The Rwandan genocide occurred in 1994, with ethnic violence between the Hutu and Tutsi ethnicities. The primary belligerents were the Hutu; however, as with most ethnic conflicts, not all Hutu wanted to kill Tutsi. A survivor, Mectilde, described the Hutu breakdown as follows: 10% helped, 30% forced, 20% reluctant, and 40% willing. For the willing, a rewards structure was put in place. For the unwilling, a punishment system was in effect. The combination, Professor Bhavnani argues, is a behavioral norm enforced by in-group policing. Instead of the typical peer pressure associated with Western high school students, the peer pressure within the Rwandan genocide, where Tutsi and Hutu have inter-married, worked under coercion. Property destruction, rape, incarceration, and death faced the Hutu who were unwilling to commit to the genocide or protect the Tutsi from violence.

When observing a sample community of 3426 in the village of Tare during the genocide, McDoom found that neighborhoods and familial structures are important micro-spaces that helped determine if an individual would participate in violence. Physical proximity increases the likelihood of social interaction and influence. For example, starting at a set point such as the home of a "mobilizing" agent for the Hutu (any individual who planned or led an attack in the village), the proportion of convicts living in a 100m radius of a resident is almost twice as many for convicts (individuals convicted of genocide by the gacaca, a local institution of transitional justice that allows villagers to adjudicate on many of the perpetrators' crimes by themselves) as for non-convicts. As the radius increases, so does the proportion decrease. This data implies that "social influence" was a major factor. Looking at neighborhoods, an individual is 4% more likely to join the genocide for every single percentage point increase in the proportion of convicted perpetrators living within a 100m radius of them. Looking at familial structures, for any individual, each percentage point increase in the proportion of genocide participants in the individual's household increased their chances of joining the violence by 21 to 25%.

However, the complete situation is a little more nuanced. The extreme control of citizens' daily lives by the government in social affairs facilitated the rapidity of the genocide's spread and broke down the resolve of some who initially wanted to have no part in the genocide. First, before the genocide, Rwandans' sense of discipline was introduced and reinforced through weekly umuganda (collective work) sessions, involving praise for the regime and its leaders and a host of collective activities for the community. Respect for authority and the fear of stepping out of line were strong cultural values of pre-genocide Rwanda and so were included in these activities. Second, their value of social conformity only increased in the decades leading up to the genocide in both social and political manners. Peasants were told exactly when and what to farm and could be fined for any lack of compliance. These factors helped to drive the killings' fast pace.

Most importantly, there were already ethnic tensions among the groups for a variety of reasons: conflicts over land allocation (farming versus pasture) and declining prices of Rwanda's main export: coffee. These problems combined with a history of previously existing conflict. With the introduction of the Second Republic under Habyarimana, former Tutsis in power were immediately purged, and racism served as an explanation for keeping the majority Hutu in legitimate government power. As a result, when the war came, the Hutu were already introduced to the concept of racism against their very own peers.

The division in Rwanda was reinforced for hundreds of years. King Kigeli IV, a Tutsi, centralized Rwandan power in the 1800s, just as Belgian colonization was taking place. The Belgian furthered the message of distinct races, allowing Tutsi men to remain the leaders in the society.

== Applications ==
=== Leadership tool ===
==== Education ====
Principals who served as strong "instructional" leaders and introduced new curricula and academic programs were able to create a system of peer pressure at the teaching level, where the teachers placed accountability pressure on themselves.

=== Voting ===
Peer pressure can be especially effective (more so than door-to-door visits and telephone calls) in getting people to vote. Gerber, Green, and Larimer conducted a large-scale field experiment involving over 180,000 Michigan households in 2006 and four treatments: one was a reminder to vote, one was a reminder to vote and a note informing them that they were being studied, one that listed the voting records for all potential household individuals, and finally one that listed the voting records for the household individuals and their neighbors. The final treatment emphasized peer pressure within a neighborhood; neighbors could view each other's voting habits with the lists, and so the social norm of "voting is best for the community" is combined with the fear that individuals' peers would judge their lack of voting. Compared to a baseline rate of 29.7% (only the voting reminder), the treatment that utilized peer pressure increased the percentage of household voters by 8.1 percentage points (to 37.8%), which exceeds the value of in-person canvassing and personalized phone calls.

A similar large-scale field experiment conducted by Todd Rogers, Donald P. Green, Carolina Ferrerosa Young, and John Ternovski (2017) studied the impact of a social pressure mailing in the context of a high-salience election, the 2012 Wisconsin gubernatorial election. Social pressure mailers included the line, "We're sending this mailing to you and your neighbors to publicize who does and does not vote." This study found a treatment effect of 1.0 percentage point, a statistically significant but far weaker effect than the 8.1 percentage point effect reported by Gerber, Green, and Larimer. The 2017 study's effects were particularly sizable for low-propensity voters.

=== Charitable donations ===
An experiment conducted by Diane Reyniers and Richa Bhalla measured the amount donated by a group of London School of Economics students. The group was split into individual donors and pair donors. The donation amounts were revealed within each pair; then, the pair was given time to discuss their amounts and then revise them as necessary. In general, pair subjects donated an average of 3.64 pounds (Sterling) while individuals donated an average of 2.55 pounds. Furthermore, in pairs where one subject donated significantly more than the other, the latter would on average increase the donation amount by 0.55 pounds. This suggests that peer pressure "shames" individuals for making smaller donations. But when controlling for donation amount, paired subjects were significantly less happy with their donation amount than individual subjects—suggesting that paired subjects felt coerced to donate more than they would have otherwise. This leads to a dilemma: charities will do better by approaching groups of people (such as friends); however, this could result in increased donor discomfort, which would impact their future donations.

Organizational researchers have found a generally similar phenomenon among large corporations: executives and managers of large companies look to similar organizations in their industry or headquarters city to figure out the appropriate level of corporate charitable donations, and those that make smaller donations might be seen as stingy and suffer damage to their reputations.

=== Criminal justice ===
There are a number of applications for peer pressure related to adolescent exposure to the criminal justice and juvenile justice system, which relate to disproportionate minority contact, differential involvement, and topics like codes of the street. Tens of thousands of juveniles offend and make contact with the criminal justice system per day, which has significant impacts within communities and neighborhoods. Neighborhoods and social contexts contribute largely to crime outcomes through social disorganization and connections with communities. There is a significant correlation between a lack of social connection between the individual and their neighborhoods and the likelihood of offending/recidivism. Literature is mixed regarding the causality of neighborhood conditions and substance use, but it is more strongly correlated with peer pressure and differential social environments. This can be examined as a partial correlation, where peer pressure is the confound that strongly influences the relationships between social disorganization and negative outcomes like substance use and crime. Risky behaviors and lifestyles are closely related with all types of substance use, seen in the connections between crime and drug possession. Delinquent behaviors and tendencies for crime are most commonly associated with "hard drugs" like opioids and prescription drugs.

== See also ==
- Abilene paradox – False consensus due to communication failure
- Conformity – Matching opinions and behaviors to group norms
- Collective narcissism – Psychological tendency to exaggerate the positive image of one's social group
- Groupshift
- Groupthink – Psychological phenomenon that occurs within a group of people
- Guilty pleasure – Type of pleasure that one holds for something despite it not being held in high regard
- Hazing – Abusive, dangerous initiation rituals
- Ingratiation – Attempt to influence someone else by increasing their attractiveness
- Milieu control – Sociological tactic
- Opinion corridor – Theory of legitimate public discourse
- Peer contagion
- Personal distress – Type of emotional reaction
- Pluralistic ignorance – Incorrect perception of others' beliefs
- Productivism – Primacy of productivity and growth
- Self-deprecation – Act of devaluing one's self-worth
- Social exclusion – Form of social disadvantage and relegation to the fringe of society
- Social norms marketing – Strategy in health behavioral science
- Social stress – Type of psychological stress
- Suggestibility – Inclination to accept the suggestions of others
- Toxic positivity – Construct in psychology
