= Hysterical contagion =

Psychological phenomenon

In social psychology, hysterical contagion occurs when people in a group show signs of a physical problem or illness, when in reality there are psychological and social forces at work.

Hysterical contagion is a strong form of social contagion; the symptoms can include those associated with clinical hysteria.

In 1977 Frieda L. Gehlen offered a revised theory of hysterical contagion that argues that what is actually contagious is the belief that showing certain characteristics will "entitle one to the secondary benefits of the sick role." It may be an unconscious decision on the part of the individual. This approach posited by Gehlen is believed to be more consistent with the existing knowledge of the contagion process and the theoretical approaches to collective behavior.

== June bug epidemic ==
The June bug epidemic serves as a classic example of hysterical contagion. In 1962 a mysterious disease broke out in a dressmaking department of a US textile factory. The symptoms included numbness, nausea, dizziness, and vomiting. Word of a "bug" in the factory that would bite its victims and cause them to develop the above symptoms quickly spread.

Soon sixty-two employees developed this mysterious illness, some of whom were hospitalized. The news media reported on the case. After research by company physicians and experts from the US Public Health Service Communicable Disease Center, it was concluded that the case was one of mass hysteria.

While the researchers believed some workers may have in fact been bitten by an unspecified insect, anxiety was probably the cause of the symptoms. No evidence was ever found for an insect or arachnid which could cause the above flu-like symptoms, nor did all workers demonstrate bites.

Workers concluded that the environment was quite stressful; the plant had recently opened, was quite busy and organization was poor. Further, most of the victims reported high levels of stress in their lives. Social forces seemed at work too.

Of the 62 employees that reported symptoms, 59 worked on the first shift, 58 worked in the same area, and 50 of the 62 cases occurred in the two consecutive days after the media supposedly “sensationalized” the event. Most of the employees who became sick took time off to recuperate.

== See also ==
- Mass psychogenic illness
- Conversion disorder
- Body-centred countertransference
