= Mass psychogenic illness =

Spread of illness without organic cause

- Other names: Mass hysteria, epidemic hysteria, mass sociogenic illness, mass psychogenic disorder
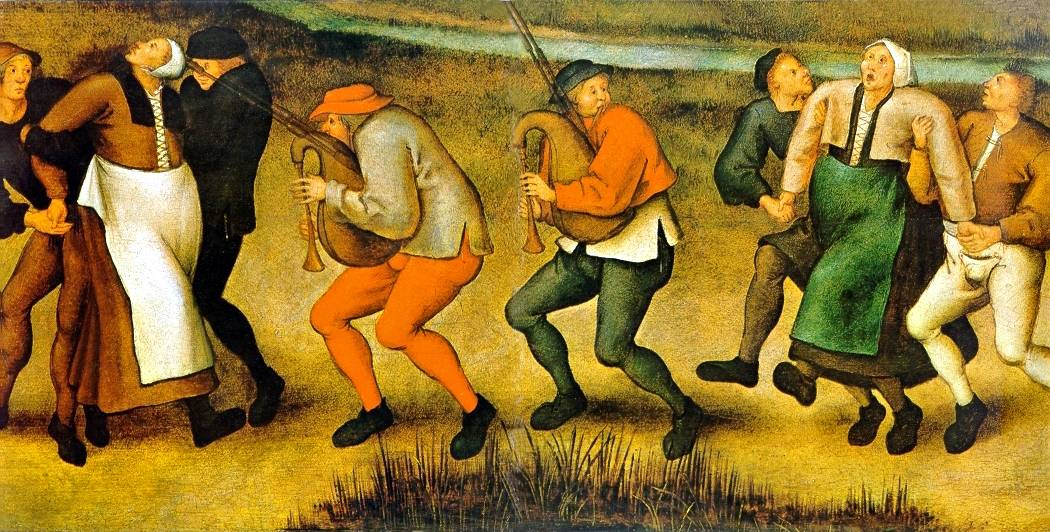
- Dancing plagues of the Middle Ages are thought to have been caused by mass hysteria. (Painting by Pieter Brueghel the Younger)
- Specialty: Psychiatry, clinical psychology
- Symptoms: Headache, dizziness, nausea, abdominal pain, cough, fatigue, sore throat
- Duration: For most cases, under 12 hours to days
- Risk factors: Childhood or adolescence; female sex (girls/women); intense media coverage, or widespread publicity
- Differential diagnosis: Actual diseases (e.g., infectious diseases, environmental toxins or exposures), somatic symptom disorder
- Treatment: Usually isolation or separation from perceived threat
- Prognosis: Most recover

Mass psychogenic illness (MPI), also called mass sociogenic illness, mass psychogenic disorder, epidemic hysteria or mass hysteria, involves the spread of illness symptoms through a population where there is no infectious agent responsible for contagion. It is the rapid spread of illness signs and symptoms affecting members of a cohesive group, originating from a nervous system disturbance involving excitation, loss, or alteration of function, whereby physical complaints that are exhibited unconsciously have no corresponding organic causes that are known.

== Signs and symptoms ==
Timothy F. Jones of the Tennessee Department of Health compiled the following symptoms based on their commonality in outbreaks occurring in 1980–1990:

Predominant symptoms in nine outbreaks of mass psychogenic illness
Symptom	Patients reporting (%)
Headache	67
Dizziness or light-headedness	46
Nausea	41
Abdominal cramps or pain	39
Cough	31
Fatigue, drowsiness or weakness	31
Sore or burning throat	30
Hyperventilation or difficulty breathing	19
Watery or irritated eyes	13
Chest tightness/chest pain	12
Inability to concentrate/trouble thinking	11
Vomiting	10
Tingling, numbness or paralysis	10
Anxiety or nervousness	8
Diarrhea	7
Trouble with vision	7
Rash	4
Loss of consciousness/syncope	4
Itching	3

== Causes and risk factors ==
MPI is distinct from other types of collective or mass delusions by involving physical symptoms. Qualities of MPI outbreaks often include:

- symptoms that have no plausible organic basis;
- symptoms that are transient and benign;
- symptoms with rapid onset and recovery;
- occurrence in a segregated group;
- the presence of extraordinary anxiety;
- symptoms that are spread via sight, sound or oral communication;
- a spread that moves down the age scale, beginning with older or higher-status people;

British psychiatrist Simon Wessely distinguishes between two forms of MPI:

- Mass anxiety hysteria: "consists of episodes of acute anxiety, occurring mainly in schoolchildren. Prior tension is absent and the rapid spread is by visual contact."
- Mass motor hysteria: "consists of abnormalities in motor behaviour. It occurs in any age group and prior tension is present. Initial cases can be identified and the spread is gradual. ... [T]he outbreak may be prolonged."

While his definition is sometimes adhered to, others contest Wessely's definition and describe outbreaks with qualities of both mass motor hysteria and mass anxiety hysteria.

The DSM-IV-TR does not define a diagnosis for this condition but the text describing conversion disorder states that "In 'epidemic hysteria', shared symptoms develop in a circumscribed group of people following 'exposure' to a common precipitant."

=== Prevalence and intensity ===
Cases of MPI frequently involve adolescents and children as the primary affected groups, with females often being disproportionately impacted. The hypothesis that those prone to extraversion or neuroticism, or those with low IQ scores, are more likely to be affected in an outbreak of hysterical epidemic has not been consistently supported by research. Bartholomew and Wessely state that it "seems clear that there is no particular predisposition to mass sociogenic illness and it is a behavioural reaction that anyone can show in the right circumstances."

Intense media coverage seems to exacerbate outbreaks. The illness may also recur after the initial outbreak. John Waller advises that once it is determined that the illness is psychogenic, it should not be given credence by authorities. For example, in the Singapore factory case study, calling in a medicine man to perform an exorcism seemed to perpetuate the outbreak.

== History ==
=== Medieval period ===
The earliest studied cases linked with epidemic hysteria are the dancing manias of the Middle Ages, including St. John's dance and tarantism. These were supposed to be associated with spirit possession or the bite of the tarantula. Those with dancing mania would dance in large groups, sometimes for weeks at a time. The dancing was sometimes accompanied by stripping, howling, the making of obscene gestures, or reportedly laughing or crying to the point of death. Dancing mania was widespread over Europe.

Between the 15th and 19th centuries, instances of motor hysteria were common in nunneries. The young women that made up these convents were sometimes forced there by family. Once accepted, they took vows of chastity and poverty. Their lives were highly regimented and often marked by strict disciplinary action. The nuns would exhibit a variety of behaviors, usually attributed to demonic possession. They would often use crude language and exhibit suggestive behaviors.

In the English translation of Hecker's The Epidemics of the Middle Ages (1844), the translator and 18th century epidemiologist Benjamin Guy Babington included a personal note of his in the Hysteria section of The Dancing Mania chapter. Babington's note recalled reading an uncited French medical journal that described a large convent of nuns in France that collectively began to meow like cats one day. The nuns meowed for long periods of time throughout the day, for several hours, until they were beaten with rods to cease the excessive meowing.

Priests were often called in to exorcise demons.

=== In factories ===
MPI outbreaks occurred in factories following the industrial revolution (1760–1840) in England, France, Germany, Italy, Russia, the United States and Singapore.

W. H. Phoon, Ministry of Labour in Singapore, gives a case study of six outbreaks of MPI in Singapore factories between 1973 and 1978. They were characterized by (1) hysterical seizures of screaming and general violence, wherein tranquilizers were ineffective (2) trance states, where a worker would claim to be speaking under the influence of a spirit or jinn and (3) frightened spells: some workers complained of unprecedented fear, or of being cold, numb, or dizzy. Outbreaks would subside in about a week. Often a bomoh (medicine man) would be called in to do a ritual exorcism. This technique was not effective and sometimes seemed to exacerbate the MPI outbreak. Females and Malay people were affected disproportionately.

Especially notable is the "June Bug" outbreak: In June 1962, a peak month in factory production, 62 workers at a dressmaking factory in a textile town in the Southern United States (Note: The factory – employing 965 workers – was named the "Montana Mills", a subsidiary of a northern business that had moved into town only a few years prior. It was said to be at "Strongsville", but both the factory name and place-name are the authors' pseudonyms. The location has been said to be Spartanburg, South Carolina, a major textile center.) experienced symptoms including severe nausea and breaking out on the skin. Most outbreaks occurred during the first shift, where four fifths of the workers were female. Of 62 total outbreaks, 59 were women, some of whom believed they were bitten by bugs from a fabric shipment. Entomologists and others were called in to discover the pathogen, but none was found.

Kerchoff coordinated the interview of affected and unaffected workers at the factory, and summarized his findings:

- Strain – those affected were more likely to work overtime frequently and provided the majority of the family income. Many were married with children.
- Affected persons tended to deny their difficulties. Kerchoff postulates that such were "less likely to cope successfully under conditions of strain."
- Results seemed consistent with a model of social contagion. Groups of affected persons tended to have strong social ties.

Kerchoff linked the rapid rate of contagion with the apparent reasonableness of the bug infestation theory and the credence given to it in accompanying news stories.

In 1974, Stahl and Lebedun described an outbreak of mass sociogenic illness in the data center of a university town in the United States Midwest. Ten of 39 workers smelling an unconfirmed "mystery gas" were rushed to a hospital with symptoms of dizziness, fainting, nausea and vomiting. They reported that most workers were young women, either putting their husbands through school or supplementing the family income. Those affected were found to have high levels of job dissatisfaction. Those with strong social ties tended to have similar reactions to the supposed gas, which only one unaffected woman reported smelling. No gas was detected in tests of the data center.

=== In schools ===
In 1962, the Tanganyika laughter epidemic was an outbreak of laughing attacks, rumored to have occurred in or near the village of Kanshasa on the western coast of Lake Victoria in what is now Tanzania, eventually affecting 14 different schools and over 1,000 people.

On the morning of Thursday 7 October 1965, at a girls' school in Blackburn in England, several girls complained of dizziness. Some fainted. Within a couple of hours, 85 girls from the school were rushed by ambulance to a nearby hospital after fainting. Symptoms included swooning, moaning, chattering of teeth, hyperpnea, and tetany. Moss and McEvedy published their analysis of the event about one year later. Their conclusions follow. Their conclusion about the above-average extraversion and neuroticism of those affected is not necessarily typical of MPI:

- Clinical and laboratory findings were essentially negative.
- Investigations by the public health authorities did not uncover any evidence of pollution of food or air.
- The epidemiology of the outbreak was investigated by means of questionnaires administered to the whole school population. It was established that the outbreaks began among the 14-year-olds, but that the heaviest incidence moved to the youngest age groups.
- By using the Eysenck Personality Inventory, it was established that, in all age groups, the mean E [extraversion] and N [neuroticism] scores of the affected were higher than those of the unaffected.
- The younger girls proved more susceptible, but disturbance was more severe and lasted longer in the older girls.
- It was considered that the epidemic was hysterical, that a previous polio epidemic had rendered the population emotionally vulnerable, and that a three-hour parade, producing 20 faints on the day before the first outbreak, had been the specific trigger.
- The data collected were thought to be incompatible with organic theories and with the compromise theory of an organic nucleus.

In 1974, mass hysteria affected schools in Berry, Alabama, and Miami Beach. In Berry, it took the form of recurring itches. In the episode in Miami Beach initially triggering fears of poison gas. It was traced back to a popular student who happened to be sick with a virus.

In June 1990, thousands were affected by the spread of a supposed illness in a province of Kosovo in March to June 1990, exclusively affecting ethnic Albanians, most of whom were young adolescents. Symptoms included headaches, dizziness, impeded respiration, muscle weakness, burning sensations, cramps, retrosternal/chest pain, dry mouth and nausea. After the illness had subsided, a bipartisan Federal Commission released a document, offering the explanation of psychogenic illness. Radovanovic of the Department of Community Medicine and Behavioural Sciences Faculty of Medicine in Safat, Kuwait, reported:

This document did not satisfy either of the two ethnic groups. Many Albanian doctors believed that what they had witnessed was an unusual epidemic of poisoning. The majority of their Serbian colleagues also ignored any explanation in terms of psychopathology. They suggested that the incident was faked with the intention of showing Serbs in a bad light but that it failed due to poor organization.

Radovanovic stated that this reported instance of mass sociogenic illness was precipitated by the demonstrated volatile and culturally tense situation in the province.

Another possible case occurred in Belgium in June 1999 when people, mainly schoolchildren, became ill after drinking Coca-Cola. In the end, scientists were divided over the scale of the outbreak, whether it fully explains the many different symptoms and the scale to which sociogenic illness affected those involved.

Starting around 2009, a spate of apparent poisonings at girls' schools across Afghanistan began to be reported; symptoms included dizziness, fainting and vomiting. The United Nations, World Health Organization and NATO's International Security Assistance Force carried out investigations of the incidents over multiple years, but never found any evidence of toxins or poisoning in the hundreds of blood, urine and water samples they tested. The conclusion of the investigators was that the girls were experiencing a mass psychogenic illness.

In 2011, a possible outbreak of mass psychogenic illness occurred at Le Roy Junior-Senior High School, in Le Roy, New York, in which multiple students began having symptoms similar to Tourette syndrome. Various health professionals ruled out such factors as Gardasil, drinking water contamination, illegal drugs, carbon monoxide poisoning and various other potential environmental or infectious causes, before diagnosing the students with a conversion disorder and mass psychogenic illness.

In August 2019 the BBC reported that schoolgirls at the Ketereh national secondary school (SMK Ketereh) in Kelantan, Malaysia, started screaming, with some claiming to have seen 'a face of pure evil'. Simon Wessely of King's College Hospital, London, suggested it was a form of 'collective behaviour'. Robert Bartholomew, an American medical sociologist and author, said, "It is no coincidence that Kelantan, the most religiously conservative of all Malaysian states, is also the one most prone to outbreaks." This view is supported by Afiq Noor, an academic, who argues that the stricter implementation of Islamic law in school in states such as Kelantan is linked to the outbreaks. He suggested that the screaming outbreak was caused by the constricted environment. In Malaysian culture, burial sites and trees are common settings for supernatural tales about the spirits of dead infants (toyol), vampiric ghosts (pontianak) and vengeful female spirits (penanggalan). Authorities responded to the Kelantan outbreak by cutting down trees around the school.

Outbreaks of mass psychogenic illness "have been reported in Catholic convents and monasteries across Mexico, Italy and France, in schools in Kosovo and even among cheerleaders in a rural North Carolina town".

Episodes of mass hysteria have been frequent in Nepalese schools, at times even leading to the temporary closure of those schools involved. In 2018, a unique phenomenon of "recurrent epidemic of mass hysteria" was reported from a school of Pyuthan district of western Nepal after a nine-year-old school girl developed crying and shouting episodes. Other children of the same school became affected in rapid succession, resulting in 47 affected students, 37 females, 10 males, in the same day. Since 2016, similar episodes of mass psychogenic illness have been occurring every year at the same school. This is seen as a rather atypical case of recurrent mass hysteria.

In July 2022, reports of up to 15 girls showing unusual symptoms such as screaming, trembling, and banging their heads came up from a government school in Bageshwar, Uttarakhand, India. Mass psychological illness has been suggested as a possible cause.

In late 2022 and early 2023, thousands of students, mostly girls, in numerous schools in Iran were initially believed to have been poisoned in various and undetermined manners by unidentified perpetrators and numerous arrests were made. On 29 April 2023, the Iranian Intelligence Ministry released the findings of a comprehensive investigation which concluded that the reported illnesses were not caused by any toxic substances. Instead they were suggested to have been due to a variety of reasons, including exposure to a variety of non-toxic substances, mass hysteria, and malingering.

In October 2023, over 100 students from the St. Theresa's Eregi Girls' High School in Musoli, Kenya were hospitalized due to rapid and involuntary arm and leg movement, sometimes accompanied by headaches and vertigo. Routine medical tests revealed nothing unusual, and there were no signs of infectious disease as a cause. Ultimately it was decided that the events were caused by "stress due to upcoming exams" and the incident was determined to be an incident of "hysteria".

Due to the determination of collective stress as the cause, medical sociologist Robert Bartholomew favors the neutral term mass psychogenic illness over mass hysteria, as people respond more favorably to a diagnosis of stress induced symptoms than to a diagnosis of mass hysteria. Bartholomew notes such outbreaks are not unusual in schools in the developing world. This is particularly true in schools in which discipline is tight and accompanied with cultural strain between administrators and students. An outbreak can be preceded by months of such tension, which then results in physical symptoms such as seen in Musoli. Far from faking it, "Under such prolonged stress, the nerves and neurons that send messages to the brain become disrupted, resulting in an array of neurological symptoms such as twitching, shaking, convulsions, and trance-like states."

Bartholomew observes that school-stress borne illness such as occurred here have not been uncommon in Africa since the 1960s. Some appear to be due to Christian missionary schools largely ignoring local traditions and mythologies. Instead, such schools impart their own mythologies and culture. This may create overwhelming anxiety due to the students being taught one thing at home, such as ancestor worship, which is then forbidden at a Christian mythology based school.

Other such outbreaks have similar tradition-based causes, such as a 1995 outbreak of "bouts of screaming, crying, foaming at the mouth, and partial paralysis" in over 600 girls at an African Muslim school in Northern Nigeria. This outbreak was surmised to be due to expectations of traditional arranged marriage, colliding with modernity's emphasis on romantic love that the students had observed in movies. The difference between these two cases of mass psychogenic illness reinforces that each outbreak needs to be evaluated in the specific circumstances in which it occurred, as such instances are "never spontaneous reactions to stress per se; they are always couched in some unique context."

=== The 1997 Pokémon incident ===
On December 16, 1997, the Pokémon anime episode "Dennō Senshi Porygon" (Electric Soldier Porygon) aired on TV Tokyo in Japan at 6:30 PM Japan Standard Time. The episode was watched by approximately 4.6 million households. Twenty minutes into the episode, a scene featured Pikachu using an electrical attack on missiles, resulting in an explosion with rapidly alternating red and blue strobe lights that flashed at approximately 12 Hz for about six seconds, using an anime technique called paka paka.

Japan's Fire Defense Agency reported that 685 children, 310 boys and 375 girls, were taken to hospitals by ambulances, with complaints of blurred vision, headaches, dizziness, nausea, seizures, convulsions, and loss of consciousness. More than 150 were admitted to hospitals, and two remained hospitalized for more than two weeks. The incident, dubbed "Pokémon Shock" (ポケモンショック, Pokémon Shokku) by the Japanese press, resulted in immediate action by authorities. TV Tokyo issued a public apology the following day and suspended the program. Nintendo shares fell nearly 3.2% as news of the incident spread. The Pokémon anime went into a four-month hiatus before returning in April 1998 with significant changes to prevent similar incidents.

While initial reports suggested thousands of children were affected, research by Benjamin Radford and sociologist Robert Bartholomew revealed a more complex picture. Their study, published in the Southern Medical Journal in 2001, found that while some children experienced genuine photosensitive epilepsy seizures, the vast majority of the over 12,000 children who reported symptoms exhibited signs more consistent with mass psychogenic illness. The study noted that many of the reported symptoms such as headaches, dizziness, and nausea were more typical of mass hysteria than of epileptic seizures, and that symptoms typically associated with seizures (drooling, stiffness, tongue biting) were largely absent.

Crucially, the researchers discovered that the timeline of the outbreak did not match what would be expected from photosensitive epilepsy alone. While approximately 600-700 children were affected on the evening of the broadcast, the number of reported cases increased dramatically, by more than 10,000, only after extensive media coverage the following day and discussions among schoolchildren. Some viewers even experienced symptoms while watching news reports that rebroadcast clips of the scene. The characteristic features of the episode were found to be consistent with epidemic hysteria, triggered by sudden anxiety after dramatic mass media reports describing the initial genuine photosensitive-epilepsy seizures.

The incident led to significant changes in Japanese broadcasting standards. New guidelines were implemented including: flashing images should not flicker faster than three times per second for red content or five times per second for other colors; flashing images should not be displayed for more than two seconds total; and stripes, whirls and concentric circles should not take up large portions of the screen. A warning about viewing distance and room lighting was added to the beginning of all Japanese television anime shows. The episode "Dennō Senshi Porygon" has never been rebroadcast anywhere in the world and was removed from rotation. The incident holds the Guinness World Record for "Most Photosensitive Epileptic Seizures Caused by a Television Show".

The Pokémon incident demonstrates how mass psychogenic illness can occur alongside genuine medical events. The initial physical stimulus of the strobe effect causing real seizures in photosensitive individuals triggered a broader wave of psychogenic symptoms through social contagion, amplified by extensive media coverage and public panic. Radford and Bartholomew concluded that while the episode genuinely caused photosensitive-epilepsy seizures in several hundred susceptible children, the majority of the more than 12,000 reported cases represented an outbreak of mass sociogenic illness as one of the largest and best-documented such outbreaks in modern times.

=== Terrorism and biological warfare ===
In 2002, Bartholomew and Wessely stated that the "concern that after a chemical, biological or nuclear attack, [is that] public health facilities may be rapidly overwhelmed by the anxious and not just the medical and psychological casualties." Early symptoms of those affected by MPI are difficult to differentiate from those actually exposed to the dangerous agent.

The first Iraqi missile hitting Israel during the Persian Gulf War was believed to contain chemical or biological weapons. Though this was not the case, 40% of those in the vicinity of the blast reported breathing problems.

Following the 2001 anthrax attacks in October 2001, there were over 2,300 false anthrax alarms in the United States. Some reported physical symptoms of what they believed to be anthrax.

In 2001, a man sprayed what was later found to be a window cleaner into a subway station in Maryland. Thirty-five people were treated for nausea, headaches and sore throats.

=== Havana syndrome ===
Beginning in 2016, some staff stationed at the US embassy in Cuba reported medical symptoms that initially were attributed to "sonic attacks", and later to other unknown weaponry. The symptoms were dubbed "Havana syndrome" by the media. The following year, some US government employees in China reported similar symptoms. Eventually, similar reports came from US government employees and their families around the globe, including in Washington DC. Due to lack of evidence of actual attack and other factors, some scientists suggested the alleged symptoms were psychogenic in nature.

Seven U.S. intelligence agencies headed by the CIA spent years reviewing thousands of possible cases of Havana syndrome and preparing a report. On 1 March 2023, the House Intelligence Committee released an unclassified version of the report, titled an "Intelligence Community Assessment". Politico summarized the results by saying, "The finding undercuts a years-long narrative, propped up by more than a thousand reports from government employees, that a foreign adversary used pulsed electro-magnetic energy waves to sicken Americans."

A 2023 academic review article stated that the U.S. intelligence community had concluded that Havana Syndrome is "a socially constructed catch-all category for an array of pre-existing health conditions, responses to environmental factors, and stress reactions that were lumped under a single label".

=== Refugees in Sweden ===
Refugee children in Sweden have been reported to fall into coma-like states on learning their families will be deported. The condition, known as resignation syndrome (Swedish: uppgivenhetssyndrom), is believed to only exist among the refugee population in Sweden, where it has been prevalent since the early part of the 21st century. Commentators state "a degree of psychological contagion" is inherent to the condition, by which young friends and relatives of the affected individual can also come to have the condition.

In a 130-page report on the condition, commissioned by the government and published in 2006, a team of psychologists, political scientists and sociologists hypothesized that it was a culture-bound syndrome, a psychological illness endemic to a specific society.

This phenomenon has later been called into question, with children witnessing that they were forced, by their parents, to act in a certain way in order to increase chances of being granted residence permits. As evidenced by medical records, healthcare professionals were aware of this scam, and witnessed parents who actively refused aid for their children, but remained silent. Later SVT, Sweden's national public television broadcaster, were severely critiqued by investigative journalist Janne Josefsson for failing to uncover the truth.

== Society and culture ==
=== Social media ===
After the rise of a popular breakthrough YouTube channel in 2019, where the presenter exhibits extensive Tourette's-like behavior, there was a sharp rise in young people referred to clinics specializing in tics, thought to be related to social contagion spread via the Internet, and also to stress from eco-anxiety and the COVID-19 pandemic.

A report published in August 2021 found evidence that social media was the primary vector for transmission of the Tourette's-like behavior and that it predominantly affects adolescent girls, declaring the phenomenon the first recorded instance of mass social media–induced illness (MSMI).

== Research ==
=== Diagnostic challenges ===
Besides the difficulties common to all research involving the social sciences, including a lack of opportunity for controlled experiments, MSI or MPI presents special difficulties to researchers in this field. Balaratnasingam and Janca report that the methods for "diagnosis of mass hysteria remain contentious." According to Jones, the effects resulting from MPI "can be difficult to differentiate from [those of] bioterrorism, rapidly spreading infection or acute toxic exposure."

These troubles result from the residual diagnosis of MPI. There is a lack of logic in an argument that proceeds: "There isn't anything, so it must be MPI." It is an example of an argument from ignorance, with ignorance here intended to mean "an absence of contrary evidence". It precludes the notion that an organic factor could have been overlooked (i.e. that there may have been insufficient investigation), or the possibility that the answer may currently be unknown but known at a future point in time. Nevertheless, running an extensive number of tests extends the probability of false positives. Singer, of the Uniformed Schools of Medicine, has summarized the problems with such a diagnosis:

[Y]ou find a group of people getting sick, you investigate, you measure everything you can measure ... and when you still can't find any physical reason, you say "well, there's nothing else here, so let's call it a case of MPI."

=== Relationship to autism and mirror neurons ===
Due to the role of the visual and auditory systems in MPI, a link between MPI and mirror neurons has been suggested. In this context, MPI appears as the neurological opposite of autism, caused by an overactive, not underactive, mirror neuron system. This could explain the gender difference bias observed in these two conditions, with autism predominantly affecting males (persons with autism show diminished activity in the mirror neuron system), and MPI predominantly affecting females, who appear to have a more sensitive mirror system.

== See also ==
- 1998 East Java ninja scare – Outbreak of violence in Indonesia
- Body-centred countertransference – Experience in psychotherapy
- Contagious depression – Spread of depression among a social group
- Conversion disorder – Former psychiatric diagnosis
- Culture-bound syndrome – Psychiatric and somatic symptoms experienced within a specific culture
- Day-care sex-abuse hysteria – Moral panic and series of prosecutions, one example of satanic panic
- Folie à deux – Shared psychosis, a psychotic disorder (from the French for "a madness shared by two")
- Groupthink – Psychological phenomenon that occurs within a group of people
- Herd mentality – Tendency to adopt group beliefs and behaviors
- Moral panic – Fear that some evil threatens society
- Hypochondriasis – Excessive fear of developing illness
- Hysterical contagion – Psychological phenomenon
- Satanic panic – Widespread moral panic alleging abuse
- Sick building syndrome – Symptoms of illness attributed to a building
- Social contagion – Spontaneous spread of knowledge, behavior or emotions among a group
