= Groupshift =

Groupshift is a phenomenon in which the initial positions of individual members of a group are exaggerated toward a more extreme position. (Note: "Groupshift occurs when group members take group decisions that carry either more risk (adventurous) or less risk (conservative) than the decision that individual members would.") When people are in groups, they make decisions about risk differently from when they are alone. The decision made tends to be even more risk-averse if the group members' opinions are risk-averse on average, and even more risk-seeking if the group members' opinions are risk seeking on average. In a group, people are likely to exhibit a slight preference towards riskier decisions as the risk is divided among the group members rather than borne by an individual.

== Overview ==
An example of groupshift is when the fans of a sports team celebrate the win of their team and their celebration turns to destruction of property. What appears to happen in groups is that the discussion leads to a significant shift in the positions of members toward a more extreme position in the direction in which they were already leaning before the discussion; so conservative types become more cautious and the more aggressive types take on more risk. For example, one study examined what would occur if prejudiced students were asked to discuss racial issues and what would happen if non-prejudiced students discussed the same racial issues. The prejudiced students became more prejudiced whilst the non-prejudiced students became more non-prejudiced (Myers & Bishop, 1970). The group discussion tends to exaggerate the initial position of the group.

This idea seems to relate quite well with the basic principles of groupthink, which is a mode of thinking that people engage in when they are deeply involved in a cohesive group, when the members' strivings for unanimity override their motivation to realistically appraise alternative courses of action. Groupshift can be seen to be evident within groupthink as a sub-set of typical thinking patterns that occur in group situations and can be observed in society in situations such as student bodies, government, sporting teams and juries.

== Origin ==
The first term for groupshift, coined in the early 1960s, was risky shift and was used to describe the tendency for groups to take more risks than the individuals within these groups would have taken had they been faced with the same problem alone (Baumeister & Bushman, 2008). There were inconsistencies with early studies however, which led some researchers to introduce the term stingy shift, which was basically the same as a risky shift in that the group would tend to agree on the decision, however in this case, the decision was to be more conservative, or stingy (Baumeister & Bushman, 2008).

== Causes ==
There are varying explanations that attempt to provide a reason as to why groupshift occurs.

- Group diffuses responsibility: a diffusion of responsibility throughout the group seems to give members of these groups a free rein to act as they see fit (Wallach, Kogan, & Bem 1964). The emotional bonds that are created within the group serve to decrease anxiety within the group and the actual risk of the situation seems less.
- Brown (1965) indicates that social status in groups is often associated with risk-taking, leading people to avoid a low risk position.
- Collins and Guetzkow (1964) suggested that high risk-takers are more confident and hence may persuade others to take greater risks.
- Bateson (1966) suggests that as people pay attention to a possible action, they become more familiar and comfortable with it and hence perceive less risk.

The size of the group also has an effect on how susceptible the group will be to polarization. The greater the number of people in a group, the greater the tendency toward deindividuation. In other words, deindividuation is a group-size-effect. As groups get larger, trends in risk-taking are amplified.

Scientific research also suggests that males are greater risk-takers than females (Wilde 1994) a trait that likely has both physiological and social roots. Numerous accident statistics support this assertion. For example, in the period 1984–1996 in Canada, 90% of avalanche fatalities were male (Jamieson & Geldsetzer, 1996).

== Using the risky shift ==
Whatever the cause of the risky shift phenomenon or the worries regarding the generality of the phenomenon, the point of interest is that individuals may be manipulated in their decision making. The mechanism causing the post-discussion group shift causes a change in the perception of the problem domain by some or all of the group members.

== See also ==
- Abilene paradox
- Group polarization

== Sources ==
- Brown, R. (1965). Social Psychology. New York: Free Press.
- Collins, B. E., & Guetzkow, H. S. (1964). A social psychology of group processes for decision-making. Wiley.
- Myers D, Murdoch P, Smith, G, 1970, Responsibility diffusion and drive enhancement effects on risky-shift, Journal of Personality, 38
- Wallach, M.A., Kogan, N. & Bem D. J. (1964). Diffusion of Responsibility and Level of Risk Taking in Groups. Journal of Abnormal Social Psychology, Vol. 68, No. 3, pp. 263 – 274.
