= General group problem solving model =

The general group problem solving model (GGPS model) is a problem solving methodology, in which a group of individuals will define the desired outcome, identify the gap between the current state and the target and generate ideas for closing the gap by brainstorming. The result is list of actions needed to achieve the desired results.

== Beyond groupthink ==
Sally Fuller and Ramon Aldag argue that group decision-making models have been operating under too narrow of a focus due to the overemphasis of the groupthink phenomenon. In addition, according to them, group decision-making has often been framed in relative isolation, ignoring context and real-world circumstances, which is a likely consequence of testing group decision-making in laboratory studies. They claim that the groupthink model is overly deterministic and an unrealistically restrictive depiction of the group problem-solving process.” To address these problems, they propose a new model that incorporates elements of group decision-making processes from a broader, more comprehensive perspective, offering a more general and generalizable framework for future research. The model includes elements of Irving Janis's original model (1977), but only those that have been consistently supported by the literature. To understand the differences between the two models, we briefly summarize both Janis's model and the GGPS-model first.

== The original groupthink model ==
Janis defines groupthink as “the mode of thinking that persons engage in when concurrence-seeking becomes so dominant in a cohesive in-group that it tends to over-ride realistic appraisals of alternative courses of action.” In a subsequent article, he elaborates on this by saying: “I use the term "groupthink" as a quick and easy way to refer to a mode of thinking that people engage in when they are deeply involved in a cohesive in-group, when the members' strivings for unanimity override their motivation to realistically appraise alternative courses of action. Groupthink refers to a deterioration of mental efficiency, reality testing, and moral judgment that results from in-group pressures.” All this suggests that the original groupthink model was proposed for a rather specific situation, and Janis states that we can only call a phenomenon groupthink if all the warning signs are present (see groupthink symptoms).

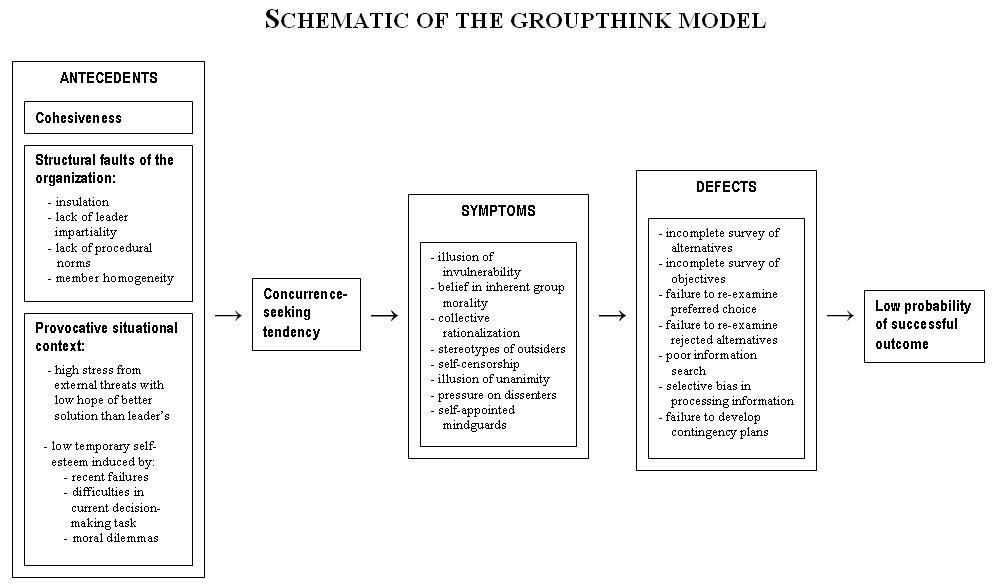

== The GGPS-model ==
The GGPS-model (developed by Ramon Aldag and Sally Fuller) broadens the perspectives, incorporating elements of the original groupthink model, in a fashion that creates a more widely applicable schematic. Two key differences should be noted in comparison to Janis’ model:

1. The GGPS model presents elements of the group problem-solving process in a value-neutral manner. The groupthink model is restrictive and deterministic in the sense that numerous elements are phrased to suggest that certain aspects of the process are pathological, such as ”too few alternatives”. The GGPS model suggests no such assumptions in its terms, and recasts this term as ”number of alternatives”.
2. Fuller and Aldag argue that a comprehensive model has to reflect the political environment of the real world and real workplaces. Thus, the GGPS model considers a larger set of antecedents than the groupthink model, among these are group type, leader power, organizational political norms etc.

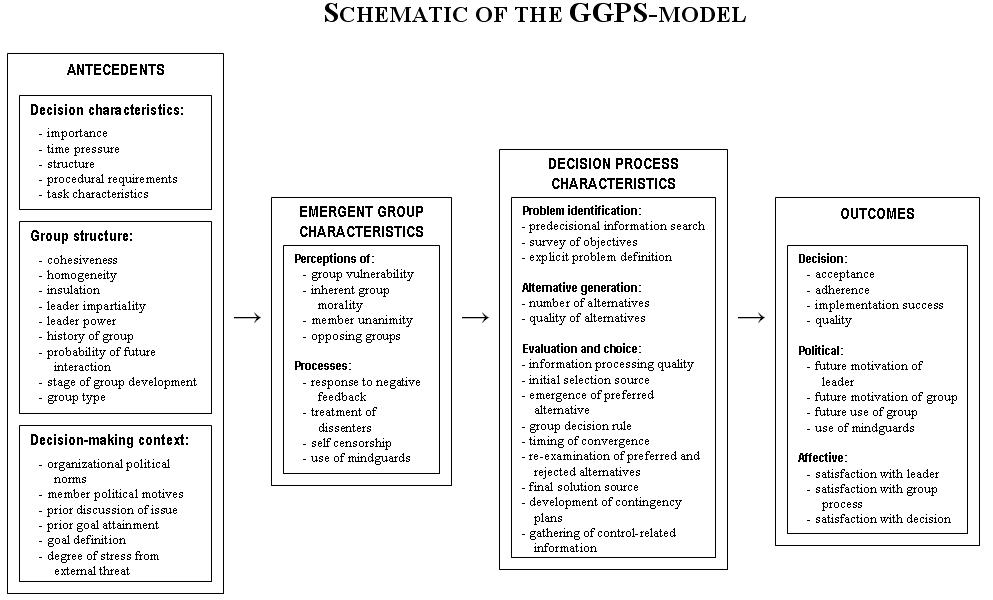

=== Elements of the GGPS model ===
==== Antecedents ====
Three sets of antecedents are proposed by GGPS: decision characteristics, group structure and decision-making context.

===== Decision characteristics =====
Elements belonging here are the importance of the decision, time pressure, structure, procedural requirements, and task characteristics.

Examples: whether the task is simple or complex will make a substantial difference in required member input, as well as in whether a directive leader is necessary. Group interaction is also altered if, given a task, a single correct answer exists and if it becomes obvious to any of the members, since subsequent group interaction will likely be reduced.

===== Group structure =====
Elements are cohesiveness, members’ homogeneity, insulation of the group, leader impartiality, leader power, history of the group, probability of future interaction, stage of group development and type of group.

Examples: whether group members anticipate to work together again in the future can have a major impact on to what degree can political motives influence the process. If it's unlikely that the group will come together again, political influence can be lessened. Stage of group development is important because members of mature group with a long history may feel more comfortable challenging each other's ideas, thus cohesiveness results in quality decision making and positive outcomes.

===== Decision making context =====
Elements are organizational political norms, member political motives, prior discussion of issue, prior goal attainment, goal definition, and degree of stress from external threat.

Examples: whether group members identified and pursue a unitary goal or they have multiple, discrepant goals influences the rationality of the decision-making process. Members’ political motives also make a tremendous difference, if individuals have a vested interest in certain outcomes, or there are one or more coalitions present, behavior in the decision-making process could be altered.

==== Emergent group characteristics ====
The model differentiates two categories of emergent group characteristics: group perceptions and processes.

===== Group Perceptions =====
These include members’ perceptions of the group's vulnerability, the inherent morality of the group, member unanimity, and views of opposing groups.

===== Group Processes =====
These include the group's response to negative feedback, treatment of dissenters, self-censorship, and use of mindguards.

==== Decision process characteristics ====
Decision process characteristics are grouped in terms of the first three stages of group problem-solving processes: problem identification, alternative generation and evaluation and choice. Implementation and control stages are not included because they follow the actual decision, but some variables preparing for those stages are indeed included (e.g. development of contingency plans and gathering of control-related information).

===== Problem identification =====
Elements of this stage are predecisional information search, survey of objectives, and explicit problem definition.

Example: if members of the group fail to explicitly or correctly define the problem, there is a chance that they will solve the wrong problem.

===== Alternative generation =====
Elements are number of alternatives and quality of alternatives.

Example: in generating alternatives, it's important to differentiate quality and quantity of alternative ideas generated. Some group processes, such as brainstorming, are directed towards generating large numbers of ideas, with the assumption that it will lead to a superior alternative. Defective processes, on the other hand, might lead to large numbers of low quality ideas.

===== Evaluation and choice =====
Elements are information processing quality, the source of the initial selection of a preferred alternative, emergence of preferred alternative, group decision rule, timing of convergence, reexamination of preferred and rejected alternatives, source of the final solution, development of contingency plans, and gathering of control-related information.

Example: whether the group decides based on a majority rule or a consensus has to be reached, makes a great difference in the process. If a consensus is to be reached, dissent could be discouraged, because dissenters could elongate and jeopardize the process. With a majority rule, dissent is more acceptable.

==== Outcomes ====
The GGPS model includes an array of decision, political and affective outcomes.

Decision outcomes: include acceptance of the decision by those affected by it and/or those who have to implement it, adherence to the decision, implementation success, and decision quality.

Example: if the leader of the group is not satisfied with the decision, he/she might unilaterally reverse it.

Political outcomes: include future motivation of the leader, future motivation of the group and future use of the group.

Example: if the outcome did not satisfy the political agenda of the leader, he/she might use the group less or not at all in the future.

Affective outcomes: include satisfaction with the leader, satisfaction with the group process and satisfaction with the decision.

Example: whether members are content with the fairness of the group process, whether trust was developed and preserved, or whether commitment to the decision is strong will greatly influence the group's future functioning.
