= Global Assessment of Functioning =

Scale to rate how well one is meeting various problems in living

The Global Assessment of Functioning (GAF) is a numeric scale used by mental health clinicians and physicians to rate subjectively the social, occupational, and psychological functioning of an individual, i.e., how well one is meeting various problems in living. Scores range from 100 (extremely high functioning) to 1 (severely impaired).

The GAF scale was originally developed in 1989 by the American Psychiatric Association and used in the DSM-IV. However, it was replaced in the DSM-5, published in 2013, by the World Health Organization Disability Assessment Schedule 2.0 (WHODAS 2.0). This scale enables a cross-disease and culture-independent assessment of functional health in key areas of life. The WHODAS 2.0 is considered more detailed and objective than a single global assessment using the GAF scale. The 36-item version of the WHODAS 2.0 is also included in the ICD-11.

== Development and exclusion from DSM-5 ==
Interest in a quantifiable global rating of functioning dates back to as early as 1962 with the publication of the Health-Sickness Rating Scale (which was rated 0 to 100) by Luborsky et al. in the paper "Clinicians' Judgements of Mental Health". This was subsequently revised in 1976 as the Global Assessment Scale (GAS) in the paper "The Global Assessment Scale:Procedure for Measuring Overall Severity of Psychiatric Disturbance" by Endicott et al. The rating scale was further modified and published as the Global Assessment of Functioning Scale in the DSM-III-R and DSM-IV. Some versions of the scale stopped at 90 as the maximum score, and others extended to 100. Because the scale was most often used with people seeking health services, it would be rare to have scores over 90, as they would indicate not just a lack of symptoms, but also "superior functioning."

The related Social and Occupational Functioning Assessment Scale (SOFAS) was initially described in a paper by Goldman et al. in 1992 in the paper "Revising Axis V for DSM-IV: A review of measures of social functioning." The DSM-IV included the SOFAS within the section "Criteria Sets and Axes Provided for Further Study." The SOFAS scale is similar to the GAF, but it only looks at social and occupational functioning rather than also considering symptom severity.

DSM-5 removed the multiaxial system, including Axis V disability and functioning; and the DSM-5 Task Force recommended the GAF be replaced by the World Health Organization Disability Assessment Schedule 2.0 (WHODAS 2.0).

== Scale ==
91 – 100 No symptoms. Superior functioning in a wide range of activities, life's problems never seem to get out of hand, is sought out by others because of his or her many positive qualities. [Note that this range is not included in some versions of the GAF]

81 – 90 Absent or minimal symptoms (e.g., mild anxiety before an exam), good functioning in all areas, interested and involved in a wide range of activities, socially effective, generally satisfied with life, no more than everyday problems or concerns.

71 – 80 If symptoms are present, they are transient and expectable reactions to psychosocial stressors (e.g., difficulty concentrating after family argument); no more than slight impairment in social, occupational, or school functioning (e.g., temporarily falling behind in schoolwork).

61 – 70 Some mild symptoms (e.g., depressed mood and mild insomnia) or some difficulty in social, occupational, or school functioning (e.g., occasional truancy, or theft within the household), but generally functioning pretty well, has some meaningful interpersonal relationships.

51 – 60 Moderate symptoms (e.g., flat affect and circumlocutory speech, occasional panic attacks) or moderate difficulty in social, occupational, or school functioning (e.g., few friends, conflicts with peers or co-workers).

41 – 50 Serious symptoms (e.g., suicidal ideation, severe obsessional rituals, frequent shoplifting) or any serious impairment in social, occupational, or school functioning (e.g., no friends, unable to keep a job, cannot work).

31 – 40 Some impairment in reality testing or communication (e.g., speech is at times illogical, obscure, or irrelevant) or major impairment in several areas, such as work or school, family relations, judgment, thinking, or mood (e.g., depressed adult avoids friends, neglects family, and is unable to work; child frequently beats up younger children, is defiant at home, and is failing at school).

21 – 30 Behavior is considerably influenced by delusions or hallucinations or serious impairment, in communication or judgment (e.g., sometimes incoherent, acts grossly inappropriately, suicidal preoccupation) or inability to function in almost all areas (e.g., stays in bed all day, no job, home, or friends)

11 – 20 Some danger of hurting self or others (e.g., suicide attempts without clear expectation of death; frequently violent; manic excitement) or occasionally fails to maintain minimal personal hygiene (e.g., smears feces) or gross impairment in communication (e.g., largely incoherent or mute).

1 – 10 Persistent danger of severely hurting self or others (e.g., recurrent violence) or persistent inability to maintain minimal personal hygiene or serious suicidal act with clear expectation of death.

0 Inadequate information

== Use in litigation ==
Montalvo attempts to substitute "social, occupational, or school functioning" for "overall level of functioning and carrying out activities of daily living". It is possible to see the recourse of some degree of overlap because "social functioning" is arguably a subset of overall functioning and activities of daily living. However, it is arguable whether equivalence is clearly stated in DSM-IV-TR.

GAF scores were commonly used by the Veterans Benefits Administration (VBA) to help determine disability ratings for service-connected psychiatric disorders. The probative value given to GAF scores diminished since the 2013 publication of the Diagnostic and Statistical Manual of Mental Disorders, Fifth Edition (DSM-5), which eliminated GAF scores from the Manual's nosology because GAF scores do not demonstrate good reliability or construct validity.

On February 23, 2018, the United States Court of Appeals for Veterans Claims (CAVC), issued an opinion in Golden v. Shulkin. ruling that, except for some older cases on appeal, the Board of Veterans Appeals (BVA) "... should not use [GAF scores] at all when assigning a psychiatric rating in cases where the DSM-5 applies."

In disability cases before the Social Security Administration, the agency determines if the GAF is consistent with the narrative report and it is addressed as one technique for capturing the "complexity of clinical situations." The agency noted the GAF is just one tool used by clinicians to develop the clinical picture. It cannot be used in isolation from the rest of the evidence to make a disability decision. The Commissioner of Social Security has acknowledged that the GAF system has some problems (anchor points, lack of standardization, not designed to predict an outcome, and requiring more supportive detail), but found that, if provided by an "acceptable medical source, a GAF is a medical opinion as defined in" the Regulations, and must be considered with all of the relevant evidence, but can be given "controlling weight" if well supported and not inconsistent with the other evidence.

== See also ==
- Diagnostic classification and rating scales used in psychiatry
- Children's Global Assessment Scale
