= Aldag =

Aldag is a surname. Notable people with the surname include:

- Bill Aldag (1905–1974), Australian rules footballer
- John Aldag (born 1963), Canadian politician
- Peter Aldag (born 1965), German sailor
- Ramon J. Aldag (born 1945), American academic
- Roger Aldag (born 1953), Canadian football player
- Rolf Aldag (born 1968), German cyclist
