= Psychology Today =

American magazine and media organization

- Cover of the magazine's January 2023 issue
- Editor-in-chief: Kaja Perina
- Categories: Psychology
- Frequency: Bimonthly
- Publisher: John Thomas
- Total circulation: 275,000 (as of 2023)
- Founded: 1967; 59 years ago
- Company: Sussex Publishers
- Country: United States
- Based in: 16 West 22nd Street, Suite 200, New York City, U.S.
- Language: English
- Website: psychologytoday.com
- ISSN: 0033-3107
- OCLC: 1116962462

Psychology Today is an American media organization with a focus on psychology and human behavior.

The publication began as a bimonthly magazine, which first appeared in 1967. The print magazine's reported circulation is 275,000 as of 2023. The Psychology Today website features therapist and health professional directories and hundreds of blogs written by a wide variety of psychologists, psychiatrists, counselors, social workers, medical doctors, marriage and family therapists, anthropologists, sociologists, and science journalists.

Psychology Today content and its therapist directory are found in over 20 countries worldwide. Psychology Today's therapist directory is the most widely used and allows users to sort therapists by location, insurance, types of therapy, price, and other characteristics. It also has a Spanish-language website.

== History ==
=== 20th century ===
Psychology Today was founded in 1967 by Nicolas Charney. The goal of the publication is to make psychology literature accessible to the general public.

Psychology Today features reportage and information that looks inward at the workings of the brain and bonds between people. It draws on research reports and interviews with experts on topics, including human motivation, personality development, intelligence, child development, parenting practices, schizophrenia, sexuality, leadership, addiction, anxiety, politics, and human and animal behavior.

Contributors have included Irving Janis, Martin Seligman, Peter Drucker, Abraham Maslow, and others.

In 1976, Psychology Today sold 1,026,872 copies. Its circulation increased to 1,171,362 copies in 1981. In 1986, it decreased to 862,193.

From 1983 to 1987, Psychology Today was owned and managed by the American Psychological Association. The magazine has won several awards from the Society of Publication Designers.

=== 21st century ===
From June 2010 to June 2011, Psychology Today ranked among the top 10 selling consumer magazines at newsstands.

The website includes a directory of psychologists, psychiatrists, and other mental health professionals in the U.S. and globally. In June 2021, The New York Times recommended the website as a source for finding therapists.

Psychology Today is currently owned by Sussex Publishers.

The magazine is not peer-reviewed.

=== Website accessibility ===
The domain Psychologytoday.com is not available in the Wayback Machine. Attempting to search for this domain yields the message, "Sorry. This URL has been excluded from the Wayback Machine."

== Editors in chief ==
- Anastasia Toufexis, 1998–1999
- Robert Epstein, 1999–2003
- Kaja Perina, 2003–present
