= Children's Global Assessment Scale =

- Synonyms: CGAS
- Purpose: used by mental health clinicians to rate the general functioning of youths under the age of 18

The Children's Global Assessment Scale (CGAS) is a numeric scale used by mental health clinicians to rate the general functioning of youths under the age of 18. Scores range from 1 to 90 or 1 to 100, with high scores indicating better functioning. Some versions omit the range from 91 to 100, as scores in this range would mean "superior functioning"—which rarely would be seen among people seeking health services.

== Application ==
Ratings on a CGAS scale should be independent of specific mental health diagnoses. The scale is presented and described Shaffer D, Gould MS, Brasic J, et al. (1983) A children's global assessment scale (CGAS). Archives of General Psychiatry, 40, 1228–1231. Adults are evaluated on the Global Assessment Scale (GAS), which was revised to the Global Assessment of Functioning (GAF) included as Axis V in the multiaxial system of DSM-IV-TR.

== Score interpretation ==
100–91 Superior functioning in all areas (at home, at school, and with peers); involved in a wide range of activities and has many interests (e.g., has hobbies or participates in extracurricular activities or belongs to an organized group such as Scouts, etc.); likeable, confident; 'everyday' worries never get out of hand; doing well in school; no symptoms.

90–81 Good functioning in all areas; secure in family, school, and with peers; there may be transient difficulties and 'everyday' worries that occasionally get out of hand (e.g., mild anxiety associated with an important exam, occasional 'blowups' with siblings, parents or peers).

80–71 No more than slight impairments in functioning at home, at school, or with peers; some disturbance of behavior or emotional distress may be present in response to life stresses (e.g., parental separations, deaths, birth of a sibling), but these are brief and interference with functioning is transient; such children are only minimally disturbing to others and are not considered deviant by those who know them.

70–61 Some difficulty in a single area but generally functioning well (e.g., sporadic or isolated antisocial acts, such as occasionally playing hooky or petty theft; consistent minor difficulties with school work; mood changes of brief duration; fears and anxieties which do not lead to gross avoidance behaviour; self-doubts); has some meaningful interpersonal relationships; most people who do not know the child well would not consider him/her deviant but those who do know him/her well might express concern.

60–51 Variable functioning with sporadic difficulties or symptoms in several but not all social areas; disturbance would be apparent to those who encounter the child in a dysfunctional setting or time but not to those who see the child in other settings.

50–41 Moderate degree of interference in functioning in most social areas or severe impairment of functioning in one area, such as might result from, for example, suicidal preoccupations and ruminations, school refusal and other forms of anxiety, obsessive rituals, major conversion symptoms, frequent anxiety attacks, poor to inappropriate social skills, frequent episodes of aggressive or other antisocial behaviour with some preservation of meaningful social relationships.

40–31 Major impairment of functioning in several areas and unable to function in one of these areas i.e., disturbed at home, at school, with peers, or in society at large, e.g., persistent aggression without clear instigation; markedly withdrawn and isolated behaviour due to either mood or thought disturbance, suicidal attempts with clear lethal intent; such children are likely to require special schooling and/or hospitalisation or withdrawal from school (but this is not a sufficient criterion for inclusion in this category).

30–21 Unable to function in almost all areas e.g., stays at home, in ward, or in bed all day without taking part in social activities or severe impairment in reality testing or serious impairment in communication (e.g., sometimes incoherent or inappropriate).

20–11 Needs considerable supervision to prevent hurting others or self (e.g., frequently violent, repeated suicide attempts) or to maintain personal hygiene or gross impairment in all forms of communication, e.g., severe abnormalities in verbal and gestural communication, marked social aloofness, stupor, etc.

10–1 Needs constant supervision (24-hour care) due to severely aggressive or self-destructive behaviour or gross impairment in reality testing, communication, cognition, affect or personal hygiene.

== See also ==
- Diagnostic classification and rating scales used in psychiatry
