= Groupthink =

Psychological phenomenon that occurs within a group of people

Groupthink is a psychological phenomenon that occurs within a group of people in which the desire for harmony or conformity in the group results in an irrational or dysfunctional decision-making outcome. Cohesiveness, or the desire for cohesiveness, in a group may produce a tendency among its members to agree at all costs. This causes the group to minimize conflict and reach a consensus decision without critical evaluation.

Groupthink is a construct of social psychology but has an extensive reach and influences literature in the fields of communication studies, political science, management, and organizational theory, as well as important aspects of deviant religious cult behaviour.

== Overview ==
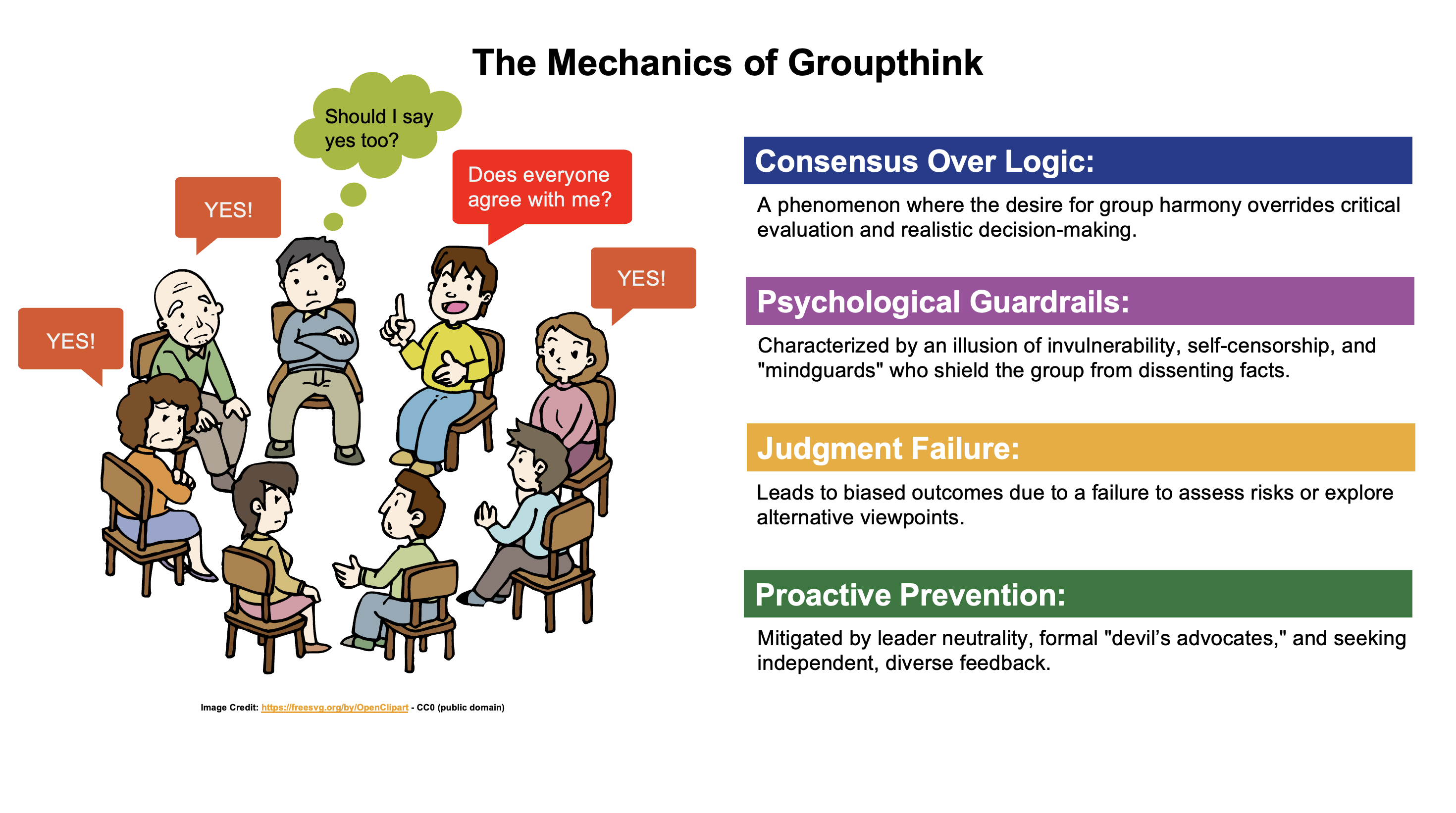
Mechanics of Groupthink

Groupthink is sometimes stated to occur (more broadly) within natural groups within the community, for example to explain the lifelong different mindsets of those with differing political views (such as "conservatism" and "liberalism" in the U.S. political context or the purported benefits of team work vs. work conducted in solitude).

The term was coined in 1952 by William H. Whyte Jr. Most of the initial research on groupthink was conducted by Irving Janis, a research psychologist from Yale University. Janis published an influential book in 1972, which was revised in 1982. Janis used the Bay of Pigs Invasion (the failed American invasion of Cuba in 1961) and the Japanese attack on Pearl Harbor in 1941 as his two prime case studies. Later studies have evaluated and reformulated his groupthink model.

== History ==
From "Groupthink" by William H. Whyte Jr. in Fortune magazine, March 1952

William H. Whyte Jr. derived the term from George Orwell's 1949 novel Nineteen Eighty-Four, and popularized it in 1952 in Fortune magazine:

Groupthink being a coinage – and, admittedly, a loaded one – a working definition is in order. We are not talking about mere instinctive conformity – it is, after all, a perennial failing of mankind. What we are talking about is a rationalized conformity – an open, articulate philosophy which holds that group values are not only expedient but right and good as well.

Groupthink was Whyte's diagnosis of the malaise affecting both the study and practice of management (and, by association, America) in the 1950s. Whyte was dismayed that employees had subjugated themselves to the tyranny of groups, which crushed individuality and were instinctively hostile to anything or anyone that challenged the collective view.

American psychologist Irving Janis (Yale University) pioneered the initial research on the groupthink theory. He does not cite Whyte, but coined the term again by analogy with "doublethink" and similar terms that were part of the newspeak vocabulary in the novel Nineteen Eighty-Four by George Orwell. He initially defined groupthink as follows:

I use the term groupthink as a quick and easy way to refer to the mode of thinking that persons engage in when concurrence-seeking becomes so dominant in a cohesive ingroup that it tends to override realistic appraisal of alternative courses of action. Groupthink is a term of the same order as the words in the newspeak vocabulary George Orwell used in his dismaying world of 1984. In that context, groupthink takes on an invidious connotation. Exactly such a connotation is intended, since the term refers to a deterioration in mental efficiency, reality testing and moral judgments as a result of group pressures.

He went on to write:

The main principle of groupthink, which I offer in the spirit of Parkinson's Law, is this: "The more amiability and esprit de corps there is among the members of a policy-making ingroup, the greater the danger that independent critical thinking will be replaced by groupthink, which is likely to result in irrational and dehumanizing actions directed against outgroups".

Janis set the foundation for the study of groupthink starting with his research in the American Soldier Project where he studied the effect of extreme stress on group cohesiveness. After this study he remained interested in the ways in which people make decisions under external threats. This interest led Janis to study a number of "disasters" in American foreign policy, such as failure to anticipate the Japanese attack on Pearl Harbor (1941); the Bay of Pigs Invasion fiasco (1961); and the prosecution of the Vietnam War (1964–67) by President Lyndon Johnson. He concluded that in each of these cases, the decisions occurred largely because of groupthink, which prevented contradictory views from being expressed and subsequently evaluated.

After the publication of Janis' book Victims of Groupthink in 1972, and a revised edition with the title Groupthink: Psychological Studies of Policy Decisions and Fiascoes in 1982, the concept of groupthink was used to explain many other faulty decisions in history. These events included Nazi Germany's decision to invade the Soviet Union in 1941, the Watergate scandal and others. Despite the popularity of the concept of groupthink, fewer than two dozen studies addressed the phenomenon itself following the publication of Victims of Groupthink, between the years 1972 and 1998. This was surprising considering how many fields of interests it spans, which include political science, communications, organizational studies, social psychology, management, strategy, counseling, and marketing. One can most likely explain this lack of follow-up in that group research is difficult to conduct, groupthink has many independent and dependent variables, and it is unclear "how to translate [groupthink's] theoretical concepts into observable and quantitative constructs".

Nevertheless, outside research psychology and sociology, wider culture has come to detect groupthink in observable situations, for example:

- " [...] critics of Twitter point to the predominance of the hive mind in such social media, the kind of groupthink that submerges independent thinking in favor of conformity to the group, the collective"
- "[...] leaders often have beliefs which are very far from matching reality and which can become more extreme as they are encouraged by their followers. The predilection of many cult leaders for abstract, ambiguous, and therefore unchallengeable ideas can further reduce the likelihood of reality testing, while the intense milieu control exerted by cults over their members means that most of the reality available for testing is supplied by the group environment. This is seen in the phenomenon of 'groupthink', alleged to have occurred, notoriously, during the Bay of Pigs fiasco."
- "Groupthink by Compulsion [...] [G]roupthink at least implies voluntarism. When this fails, the organization is not above outright intimidation. [...] In [a nationwide telecommunications company], refusal by the new hires to cheer on command incurred consequences not unlike the indoctrination and brainwashing techniques associated with a Soviet-era gulag."

== Symptoms ==
To make groupthink testable, Irving Janis devised eight symptoms indicative of groupthink:

Type I: Overestimations of the group – its power and morality

- Illusions of invulnerability creating excessive optimism and encouraging risk taking.
- Unquestioned belief in the morality of the group, causing members to ignore the consequences of their actions.

Type II: Closed-mindedness

- Rationalizing warnings that might challenge the group's assumptions.
- Stereotyping those who are opposed to the group as weak, evil, biased, spiteful, impotent, or stupid.

Type III: Pressures toward uniformity

- Self-censorship of ideas that deviate from the apparent group consensus.
- Illusions of unanimity among group members, silence is viewed as agreement.
- Direct pressure to conform placed on any member who questions the group, couched in terms of "disloyalty".
- Mindguards – self-appointed members who shield the group from dissenting information.

When a group exhibits most of the symptoms of groupthink, the consequences of a failing decision process can be expected: incomplete analysis of the other options, incomplete analysis of the objectives, failure to examine the risks associated with the favored choice, failure to reevaluate the options initially rejected, poor information research, selection bias in available information processing, failure to prepare for a back-up plan.

== Causes ==
Janis identified three antecedent conditions to groupthink:

- High group cohesiveness: Cohesiveness is the main factor that leads to groupthink. Groups that lack cohesiveness can of course make bad decisions, but they do not experience groupthink. In a cohesive group, members avoid speaking out against decisions, avoid arguing with others, and work towards maintaining friendly relationships in the group. If cohesiveness gets to such a level that there are no longer disagreements between members, then the group is ripe for groupthink.
  - Deindividuation: Group cohesiveness becomes more important than individual freedom of expression.
  - Illusions of unanimity: Members perceive falsely that everyone agrees with the group's decision; silence is seen as consent. Janis noted that the unity of group members was mere illusion. Members may disagree with the organizations' decision, but go along with the group for many reasons, such as maintaining their group status and avoiding conflict with managers or workmates. Such members think that suggesting opinions contrary to others may lead to isolation from the group.
- Structural faults: The group is organized in ways that disrupt the communication of information, or the group carelessly makes decisions.
  - Insulation of the group: This can promote the development of unique, inaccurate perspectives on issues the group is dealing with, which can then lead to faulty solutions to the problem.
  - Lack of impartial leadership: Leaders control the group discussion, by planning what will be discussed, allowing only certain questions to be asked, and asking for opinions of only certain people in the group. Closed-style leadership is when leaders announce their opinions on the issue before the group discusses the issue together. Open-style leadership is when leaders withhold their opinion until a later time in the discussion. Groups with a closed-style leader are more biased in their judgments, especially when members had a high degree of certainty.
  - Lack of norms requiring methodological procedures.
  - Homogeneity of members' social backgrounds and ideology.
- Situational context:
  - Highly stressful external threats: High-stake decisions can create tension and anxiety; group members may cope with this stress in irrational ways. Group members may rationalize their decision by exaggerating the positive consequences and minimizing the possible negative consequences. In attempt to minimize the stressful situation, the group decides quickly and allows little to no discussion or disagreement. Groups under high stress are more likely to make errors, lose focus of the ultimate goal, and use procedures that members know have not been effective in the past.
  - Recent failures: These can lead to low self-esteem, resulting in agreement with the group for fear of being seen as wrong.
  - Excessive difficulties in decision-making tasks.
  - Moral dilemmas

Although it is possible for a situation to contain all three of these factors, all three are not always present even when groupthink is occurring. Janis considered a high degree of cohesiveness to be the most important antecedent to producing groupthink, and always present when groupthink was occurring; however, he believed high cohesiveness would not always produce groupthink. A very cohesive group abides with all group norms; but whether or not groupthink arises is dependent on what the group norms are. If the group encourages individual dissent and alternative strategies to problem solving, it is likely that groupthink will be avoided even in a highly cohesive group. This means that high cohesion will lead to groupthink only if one or both of the other antecedents is present, situational context being slightly more likely than structural faults to produce groupthink.

A 2018 study found that absence of a tenured project leader can also create conditions for groupthink to prevail. Presence of an "experienced" project manager can reduce the likelihood of groupthink by taking steps like critically analysing ideas, promoting open communication, encouraging diverse perspectives, and raising team awareness of groupthink symptoms.

It was found that among people who have bicultural identity, those with highly integrated bicultural identity as opposed to less integrated were more prone to groupthink. In another 2022 study in Tanzania, Hofstede's cultural dimensions come into play. It was observed that in high power distance societies, individuals are hesitant to voice dissent, deferring to leaders' preferences in making decisions. Furthermore, as Tanzania is a collectivist society, community interests supersede those of individuals. The combination of high power distance and collectivism creates optimal conditions for groupthink to occur.

== Prevention ==
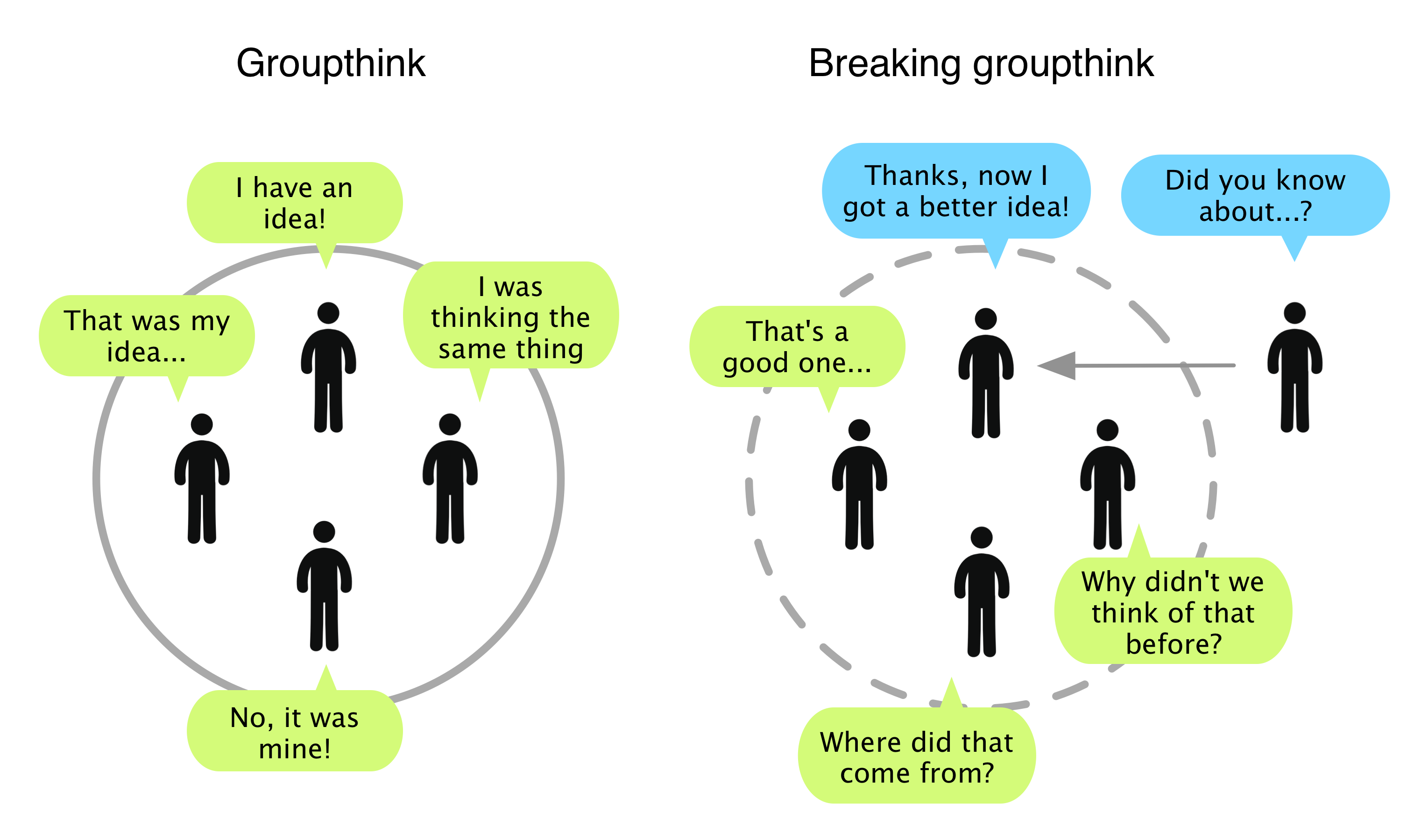
Input from an outsider can break groupthink.

As observed by Aldag and Fuller (1993), the groupthink phenomenon seems to rest on a set of unstated and generally restrictive assumptions:

- The purpose of group problem solving is mainly to improve decision quality
- Group problem solving is considered a rational process.
- Benefits of group problem solving:
  - variety of perspectives
  - more information about possible alternatives
  - better decision reliability
  - dampening of biases
  - social presence effects
- Groupthink prevents these benefits due to structural faults and provocative situational context
- Groupthink prevention methods will produce better decisions
- An illusion of well-being is presumed to be inherently dysfunctional.
- Group pressures towards consensus lead to concurrence-seeking tendencies.

It has been thought that groups with the strong ability to work together will be able to solve dilemmas in a quicker and more efficient fashion than an individual. Groups have a greater amount of resources which lead them to be able to store and retrieve information more readily and come up with more alternative solutions to a problem. There was a recognized downside to group problem solving in that it takes groups more time to come to a decision and requires that people make compromises with each other. However, it was not until the research of Janis appeared that anyone really considered that a highly cohesive group could impair the group's ability to generate quality decisions. Tight-knit groups may appear to make decisions better because they can come to a consensus quickly and at a low energy cost; however, over time this process of decision-making may decrease the members' ability to think critically. It is, therefore, considered by many to be important to combat the effects of groupthink.

According to Janis, decision-making groups are not necessarily destined to groupthink. He devised ways of preventing groupthink:

- Leaders should assign each member the role of "critical evaluator". This allows each member to freely air objections and doubts.
- Leaders should not express an opinion when assigning a task to a group.
- Leaders should absent themselves from many of the group meetings to avoid excessively influencing the outcome.
- The organization should set up several independent groups, working on the same problem.
- All effective alternatives should be examined.
- Each member should discuss the group's ideas with trusted people outside of the group.
- The group should invite outside experts into meetings. Group members should be allowed to discuss with and question the outside experts.
- At least one group member should be assigned the role of devil's advocate. This should be a different person for each meeting.

The devil's advocate in a group may provide questions and insight which contradict the majority group in order to avoid groupthink decisions. A study by Ryan Hartwig confirms that the devil's advocacy technique is very useful for group problem-solving. It allows for conflict to be used in a way that is most-effective for finding the best solution so that members will not have to go back and find a different solution if the first one fails. Hartwig also suggests that the devil's advocacy technique be incorporated with other group decision-making models such as the functional theory to find and evaluate alternative solutions. The main idea of the devil's advocacy technique is that somewhat structured conflict can be facilitated to not only reduce groupthink, but to also solve problems.

Diversity of all kinds is also instrumental in preventing groupthink. Individuals with varying backgrounds, thought, professional and life experiences etc. can offer unique perspectives and challenge assumptions. In a 2004 study, a diverse team of problem-solver outperformed a team consisting of best problem solvers as they start to think alike.

Joris Graff offered a new debate format designed to prevent groupthink from occurring in a classroom setting specifically regarding debate lessons. He agreed that greater diversity in arguments both within a team and against an opposing side would prevent groupthink and suggested several ways to introduce that diversity into debates. Graff also suggested that the goal of debates should be on consensus or compromise over designating a winner. He argues that encouraging opposing teams to work together to come up with a viable solution prevents common arguments from becoming the only arguments used due to perceived success at getting a specific desired outcome.

Psychological safety, emphasized by Edmondson and Lei and Hirak et al., is crucial for effective group performance. It involves creating an environment that encourages learning and removes barriers perceived as threats by team members. Edmondson et al. demonstrated variations in psychological safety based on work type, hierarchy, and leadership effectiveness, highlighting its importance in employee development and fostering a culture of learning within organizations.

A similar situation to groupthink is the Abilene paradox, another phenomenon that is detrimental when working in groups. When organizations fall into an Abilene paradox, they take actions in contradiction to what their perceived goals may be and therefore defeat the very purposes they are trying to achieve. Failure to communicate desires or beliefs can cause an Abilene paradox.

=== Examples ===
The Watergate scandal is an example of this. Before the scandal had occurred, a meeting took place where they discussed the issue. One of Nixon's campaign aides was unsure if he should speak up and give his input. If he had voiced his disagreement with the group's decision, it is possible that the scandal could have been avoided.

After the Bay of Pigs invasion fiasco, President John F. Kennedy sought to avoid groupthink during the Cuban Missile Crisis using "vigilant appraisal". During meetings, he invited outside experts to share their viewpoints, and allowed group members to question them carefully. He also encouraged group members to discuss possible solutions with trusted members within their separate departments, and he even divided the group up into various sub-groups, to partially break the group cohesion. Kennedy was deliberately absent from the meetings, so as to avoid pressing his own opinion.

Cass Sunstein reports that introverts can sometimes be silent in meetings with extroverts; he recommends explicitly asking for each person's opinion, either during the meeting or afterwards in one-on-one sessions. Sunstein points to studies showing groups with a high level of internal socialization and happy talk are more prone to bad investment decisions due to groupthink, compared with groups of investors who are relative strangers and more willing to be argumentative. To avoid group polarization, where discussion with like-minded people drives an outcome further to an extreme than any of the individuals favored before the discussion, he recommends creating heterogeneous groups which contain people with different points of view. Sunstein also points out that people arguing a side they do not sincerely believe (in the role of devil's advocate) tend to be much less effective than a sincere argument. This can be accomplished by dissenting individuals, or a group like a Red Team that is expected to pursue an alternative strategy or goal "for real".

== Empirical findings and meta-analysis ==
Testing groupthink in a laboratory is difficult because synthetic settings remove groups from real social situations, which ultimately changes the variables conducive or inhibitive to groupthink. Because of its subjective nature, researchers have struggled to measure groupthink as a complete phenomenon, instead frequently opting to measure its particular factors. These factors range from causal to effectual and focus on group and situational aspects.

Park (1990) found that "only 16 empirical studies have been published on groupthink", and concluded that they "resulted in only partial support of his [Janis's] hypotheses". Park concludes, "despite Janis' claim that group cohesiveness is the major necessary antecedent factor, no research has shown a significant main effect of cohesiveness on groupthink." Park also concludes that research does not support Janis' claim that cohesion and leadership style interact to produce groupthink symptoms. Park presents a summary of the results of the studies analyzed. According to Park, a study by Huseman and Drive (1979) indicates groupthink occurs in both small and large decision-making groups within businesses. This results partly from group isolation within the business. Manz and Sims (1982) conducted a study showing that autonomous work groups are susceptible to groupthink symptoms in the same manner as decisions making groups within businesses. Fodor and Smith (1982) produced a study revealing that group leaders with high power motivation create atmospheres more susceptible to groupthink. Leaders with high power motivation possess characteristics similar to leaders with a "closed" leadership style—an unwillingness to respect dissenting opinion. The same study indicates that level of group cohesiveness is insignificant in predicting groupthink occurrence. Park summarizes a study performed by Callaway, Marriott, and Esser (1985) in which groups with highly dominant members "made higher quality decisions, exhibited lowered state of anxiety, took more time to reach a decision, and made more statements of disagreement/agreement". Overall, groups with highly dominant members expressed characteristics inhibitory to groupthink. If highly dominant members are considered equivalent to leaders with high power motivation, the results of Callaway, Marriott, and Esser contradict the results of Fodor and Smith. A study by Leana (1985) indicates the interaction between level of group cohesion and leadership style is completely insignificant in predicting groupthink. This finding refutes Janis' claim that the factors of cohesion and leadership style interact to produce groupthink. Park summarizes a study by McCauley (1989) in which structural conditions of the group were found to predict groupthink while situational conditions did not. The structural conditions included group insulation, group homogeneity, and promotional leadership. The situational conditions included group cohesion. These findings refute Janis' claim about group cohesiveness predicting groupthink.

Overall, studies on groupthink have largely focused on the factors (antecedents) that predict groupthink. Groupthink occurrence is often measured by number of ideas/solutions generated within a group, but there is no uniform, concrete standard by which researchers can objectively conclude groupthink occurs. The studies of groupthink and groupthink antecedents reveal a mixed body of results. Some studies indicate group cohesion and leadership style to be powerfully predictive of groupthink, while other studies indicate the insignificance of these factors. Group homogeneity and group insulation are generally supported as factors predictive of groupthink.

== Case studies ==
=== Politics and military ===
Groupthink can have a strong hold on political decisions and military operations, which may result in enormous wastage of human and material resources. Highly qualified and experienced politicians and military commanders sometimes make very poor decisions when in a suboptimal group setting. Scholars such as Janis and Raven attribute political and military fiascoes, such as the Bay of Pigs Invasion, the Vietnam War, and the Watergate scandal, to the effect of groupthink. More recently, Dina Badie argued that groupthink was largely responsible for the shift in the U.S. administration's view on Saddam Hussein that eventually led to the 2003 invasion of Iraq by the United States. After the September 11 attacks, "stress, promotional leadership, and intergroup conflict" were all factors that gave rise to the occurrence of groupthink. Political case studies of groupthink serve to illustrate the impact that the occurrence of groupthink can have in today's political scene.

==== Bay of Pigs invasion and the Cuban Missile Crisis ====
The United States Bay of Pigs Invasion of April 1961 was the primary case study that Janis used to formulate his theory of groupthink. The invasion plan was initiated by the Eisenhower administration, but when the Kennedy administration took over, it "uncritically accepted" the plan of the Central Intelligence Agency (CIA). When some people, such as Arthur M. Schlesinger Jr. and Senator J. William Fulbright, attempted to present their objections to the plan, the Kennedy team as a whole ignored these objections and kept believing in the morality of their plan. Eventually Schlesinger minimized his own doubts, performing self-censorship. The Kennedy team stereotyped Fidel Castro and the Cubans by failing to question the CIA about its many false assumptions, including the ineffectiveness of Castro's air force, the weakness of Castro's army, and the inability of Castro to quell internal uprisings.

Janis argued the fiasco that ensued could have been prevented if the Kennedy administration had followed the methods to preventing groupthink adopted during the Cuban Missile Crisis, which took place just one year later in October 1962. In the latter crisis, essentially the same political leaders were involved in decision-making, but this time they learned from their previous mistake of seriously under-rating their opponents.

==== Pearl Harbor ====
The lack of American preparedness for the attack on Pearl Harbor on December 7, 1941, is a prime example of groupthink. A number of factors such as shared illusions and rationalizations contributed to the lack of precaution taken by U.S. Navy officers based in Hawaii. The United States had intercepted Japanese messages and they discovered that Japan was arming itself for an offensive attack somewhere in the Pacific Ocean. Washington took action by warning officers stationed at Pearl Harbor, but their warning was not taken seriously. They assumed that the Empire of Japan was taking measures in the event that their embassies and consulates in enemy territories were usurped.

The U.S. Navy and Army in Pearl Harbor also shared rationalizations about why an attack was unlikely. Some of them included:

- "The Japanese would never dare attempt a full-scale surprise assault against Hawaii because they would realize that it would precipitate an all-out war, which the United States would surely win."
- "The Pacific Fleet concentrated at Pearl Harbor was a major deterrent against air or naval attack."
- "Even if the Japanese were foolhardy enough to send their carriers to attack us [the United States], we could certainly detect and destroy them in plenty of time."
- "No warships anchored in the shallow water of Pearl Harbor could ever be sunk by torpedo bombs launched from enemy aircraft."

==== Space Shuttle Challenger disaster ====
On January 28, 1986, NASA launched the space shuttle Challenger. This was significant because a civilian, non-astronaut, high school teacher was to be the first American civilian in space. The space shuttle was perceived to be so safe as to make this possible. NASA's engineering and launch teams rely on teamwork. To launch the shuttle, individual team members must affirm each system is functioning nominally. Morton Thiokol engineers who designed and built the Challenger's rocket boosters ignored warnings that cooler temperature during the day of the launch could result in failure and death of the crew. The Space Shuttle Challenger Disaster grounded space shuttle flights for nearly three years.

The Challenger case was subject to a more quantitatively oriented test of Janis's groupthink model performed by Esser and Lindoerfer, who found clear signs of positive antecedents to groupthink in the critical decisions concerning the launch of the shuttle. The day of the launch was rushed for publicity reasons. NASA wanted to captivate and hold the attention of America. Having civilian teacher Christa McAuliffe on board to broadcast a live lesson, and the possible mention by president Ronald Reagan in the State of the Union address, were opportunities NASA deemed critical to increasing interest in its potential civilian space flight program. The schedule NASA set out to meet was, however, self-imposed. It seemed incredible to many that an organization with a perceived history of successful management would have locked itself into a schedule it had no chance of meeting.

=== Corporate world ===
In the corporate world, ineffective and suboptimal group decision-making can negatively affect the health of a company and cause a considerable amount of monetary loss.

==== Swissair ====
Aaron Hermann and Hussain Rammal illustrate the detrimental role of groupthink in the collapse of Swissair in 2002, a Swiss airline company that was thought to be so financially stable that it earned the title the "Flying Bank". The authors argue that, among other factors, Swissair carried two symptoms of groupthink: the belief that the group is invulnerable and the belief in the morality of the group. In addition, before the fiasco, the size of the company board was reduced, subsequently eliminating industrial expertise. This may have further increased the likelihood of groupthink. With the board members lacking expertise in the field and having somewhat similar background, norms, and values, the pressure to conform may have become more prominent. This phenomenon is called group homogeneity, which is an antecedent to groupthink. Together, these conditions may have contributed to the poor decision-making process that eventually led to Swissair's collapse.

==== Marks & Spencer and British Airways ====
Another example of groupthink from the corporate world is illustrated in the United Kingdom-based companies Marks & Spencer and British Airways. The negative impact of groupthink took place during the 1990s as both companies released globalization expansion strategies. Researcher Jack Eaton's content analysis of media press releases revealed that all eight symptoms of groupthink were present during this period. The most predominant symptom of groupthink was the illusion of invulnerability as both companies underestimated potential failure due to years of profitability and success during challenging markets. Up until the consequence of groupthink erupted they were considered blue chips and darlings of the London Stock Exchange. During 1998–1999 the price of Marks & Spencer shares fell from 590 to less than 300 and that of British Airways from 740 to 300. Both companies had previously been prominently featured in the UK press and media for more positive reasons, reflecting national pride in their undeniable sector-wide performance.

=== Sports ===
Recent literature of groupthink attempts to study the application of this concept beyond the framework of business and politics. One particularly relevant and popular arena in which groupthink is rarely studied is sports. The lack of literature in this area prompted Charles Koerber and Christopher Neck to begin a case-study investigation that examined the effect of groupthink on the decision of the Major League Umpires Association (MLUA) to stage a mass resignation in 1999. The decision was a failed attempt to gain a stronger negotiating stance against Major League Baseball. Koerber and Neck suggest that three groupthink symptoms can be found in the decision-making process of the MLUA. First, the umpires overestimated the power that they had over the baseball league and the strength of their group's resolve. The union also exhibited some degree of closed-mindedness with the notion that MLB is the enemy. Lastly, there was the presence of self-censorship; some umpires who disagreed with the decision to resign failed to voice their dissent. These factors, along with other decision-making defects, led to a decision that was suboptimal and ineffective.

== Recent developments ==
=== Ubiquity model ===
Researcher Robert Baron (2005) contends that the connection between certain antecedents which Janis believed necessary has not been demonstrated by the current collective body of research on groupthink. He believes that Janis' antecedents for groupthink are incorrect, and argues that not only are they "not necessary to provoke the symptoms of groupthink, but that they often will not even amplify such symptoms". As an alternative to Janis' model, Baron proposed a ubiquity model of groupthink. This model provides a revised set of antecedents for groupthink, including social identification, salient norms, and low self-efficacy.

==== General group problem-solving (GGPS) model ====
Aldag and Fuller (1993) argue that the groupthink concept was based on a "small and relatively restricted sample" that became too broadly generalized. Furthermore, the concept is too rigidly staged and deterministic. Empirical support for it has also not been consistent. The authors compare groupthink model to findings presented by Maslow and Piaget; they argue that, in each case, the model incites great interest and further research that, subsequently, invalidate the original concept. Aldag and Fuller thus suggest a new model called the general group problem-solving (GGPS) model, which integrates new findings from groupthink literature and alters aspects of groupthink itself. The primary difference between the GGPS model and groupthink is that the former is more value neutral and more political.

=== Reexamination ===
Later scholars have re-assessed the merit of groupthink by reexamining case studies that Janis originally used to buttress his model. Roderick Kramer (1998) believed that, because scholars today have a more sophisticated set of ideas about the general decision-making process and because new and relevant information about the fiascos have surfaced over the years, a reexamination of the case studies is appropriate and necessary. He argues that new evidence does not support Janis' view that groupthink was largely responsible for President Kennedy's and President Johnson's decisions in the Bay of Pigs Invasion and U.S. escalated military involvement in the Vietnam War, respectively. Both presidents sought the advice of experts outside of their political groups more than Janis suggested. Kramer also argues that the presidents were the final decision-makers of the fiascos; while determining which course of action to take, they relied more heavily on their own construals of the situations than on any group-consenting decision presented to them. Kramer concludes that Janis' explanation of the two military issues is flawed and that groupthink has much less influence on group decision-making than is popularly believed.

Groupthink, while it is thought to be avoided, does have some positive effects. Choi and Kim found that group identity traits such as believing in the group's moral superiority, were linked to less concurrence seeking, better decision-making, better team activities, and better team performance. This study also showed that the relationship between groupthink and defective decision making was insignificant. These findings mean that in the right circumstances, groupthink does not always have negative outcomes. It also questions the original theory of groupthink.

=== Reformulation ===
Scholars are challenging the original view of groupthink proposed by Janis. Whyte (1998) argues that a group's collective efficacy, i.e. confidence in its abilities, can lead to reduced vigilance and a higher risk tolerance, similar to how groupthink was described. McCauley (1998) proposes that the attractiveness of group members might be the most prominent factor in causing poor decisions. Turner and Pratkanis (1991) suggest that from social identity perspective, groupthink can be seen as a group's attempt to ward off potentially negative views of the group. Together, the contributions of these scholars have brought about new understandings of groupthink that help reformulate Janis' original model.

=== Sociocognitive theory ===
According to a theory many of the basic characteristics of groupthink – e.g., strong cohesion, indulgent atmosphere, and exclusive ethos – are the result of a special kind of mnemonic encoding (Tsoukalas, 2007). Members of tightly knit groups have a tendency to represent significant aspects of their community as episodic memories and this has a predictable influence on their group behavior and collective ideology, as opposed to what happens when they are encoded as semantic memories (which is common in formal and more loose group formations).

=== Collective illusions ===
According to scientist Todd Rose, Collective Illusions and Groupthink are linked concepts that show how social dynamics affect behavior. Groupthink occurs when individuals who are right about what the group wants, conform to the group's consensus. Collective illusions are a specific form of Groupthink where individuals mistakenly assume the group's wants, leading everyone to behave in ways that don't reflect their true preferences. Both the concepts involve social influence and conformity.

== In popular culture ==
In the 1979 religious satire Monty Python's Life of Brian, the concept of groupthink is satirized through the reactions of the crowds to Brian and his would-be followers: when he urges them that "You don't need to follow me. You don't need to follow anybody. You've got to think for yourselves. You're all individuals.", they respond in unison "Yes. We're all different." (with one voice saying "I'm not.") The film highlights how easily people can be swayed by charismatic figures, adopt a single, often illogical viewpoint, and blindly follow without individual thought.

== See also ==
- Abilene paradox
- Amity-enmity complex
- Asch conformity experiments
- Argumentum ad populum
- Bandwagon effect
- Consensus theory of truth
- Echo chamber (media)
- Emotional contagion
- False consensus effect
- Filter bubble
- Group polarization
- Group-serving bias
- Groupshift
- Herd behavior
- In-group favoritism
- Mass psychology
- Mob rule
