= Hierarchy of Influences =

Theoretical framework

In mass communication, the Hierarchy of Influences, formally known as the Hierarchical Influences Model, is an organized theoretical framework introduced by Pamela Shoemaker & Stephen D. Reese. It comprises five levels of influence on media content from the macro to micro levels: social systems, social institutions, media organizations, routine practices, and individuals. This framework was introduced in their book Mediating the Message: Theories of Influences on Mass Media Content.

== Five levels of Hierarchy of Influences ==
The framework was proposed in response to what the scholars believed was an over-emphasis on media processes and effects research. The HOI model instead made the content produced by news media the dependent variable in research studies, influenced by factors located within the hierarchical framework. From a media sociology perspective, the framework "takes into account the multiple forces that simultaneously impinge on media and suggests how influence at one level may interact with that at another." Whereas most media effects study treat media content as independent variable to understand how audience use media content and how they are influenced by media content, "Hierarchy of Influences" framework treats media content as dependent variable and five levels of influences as potential independent variables.

Overall, the framework provides a way to understand the "media and their links with culture, other organizations, and institutions."

=== Social systems ===
The macro social systems level is the outer-most ring of the model that represent the influences from social systems as a whole. This level focus on how ideological forces shape and influence media content. For this reason, it is often employed in cross-national comparative media studies.

=== Social institutions ===
Social institutional level describes influences coming from larger trans-organizational media field. How media organizations combine into larger institutions that become part of larger structured relationships that compete or depend on each other as powerful social institutions.

=== Media organizations ===
Media organization level is distinguished from routines as this level describes larger organizational and occupational context such as organizational policy, occupational roles, and how the media enterprise itself is structured.

=== Routine practices ===
The routines level has three sources of routines, which constrain and enable communicators in their work process: audiences, organizations, and suppliers of content. Journalists have developed routines from endless pattern of norms in response to common situations. This level is where Mr. Gates or gatekeeping (communication) theory is also applied in journalists' appearance.

=== Individuals ===
The micro individual level is located at the center of the model. On this level, individual communicator's characteristics, on both personal and professional, influence media content. Individual's innate characteristics such as gender, race, religious and political background influence media content indirectly through shaping personal attitude and values (e.g. ethical values) as well as professional roles and education.

== Research ==
Hierarchy of influences model has been employed as theoretical framework to explain different levels of influences on media content. Researchers have studied professionalism, journalistic roles, cross-national comparative journalistic roles, comparative media studies, and understanding news production to name a few of closely studied areas.

Thomas Hanitzsch took a similar approach to hierarchy of influences model in examining different levels of influences on journalists' reporting process in his Worlds of Journalism study. This study conducted interviews in 21 countries focusing on differences in journalism culture, influences and trust in public institutions.
