= Mindguard =

Member of a group who serves as an informational filter

In groupthink theory, a mindguard is a member of a group who serves as an informational filter, providing limited information to the group and, consciously or subconsciously, utilizing a variety of strategies to control dissent and to direct the decision-making process toward a specific, limited range of possibilities. The presence of mindguards within a group is one of eight main "symptoms" of groupthink identified by its original theorist, Irving Janis. Mindguards can be self-appointed, and multiple mindguards are frequently present in groupthink situations.

The techniques utilized, consciously or subconsciously, by mindguards include:

- time pressure in regard to decision-making
- bandwagon effect/information cascades
- reframing situations to increase pressure toward or away from a specific outcome
- creating a sense that group cohesion will suffer if unanimity is lacking
- other techniques.

Mindguards exist in a variety of group settings. They are not always easy to identify, which adds to the difficulty in countering the phenomenon.

== See also ==
- Gatekeeping (communication)
