= Tim P. Vos =

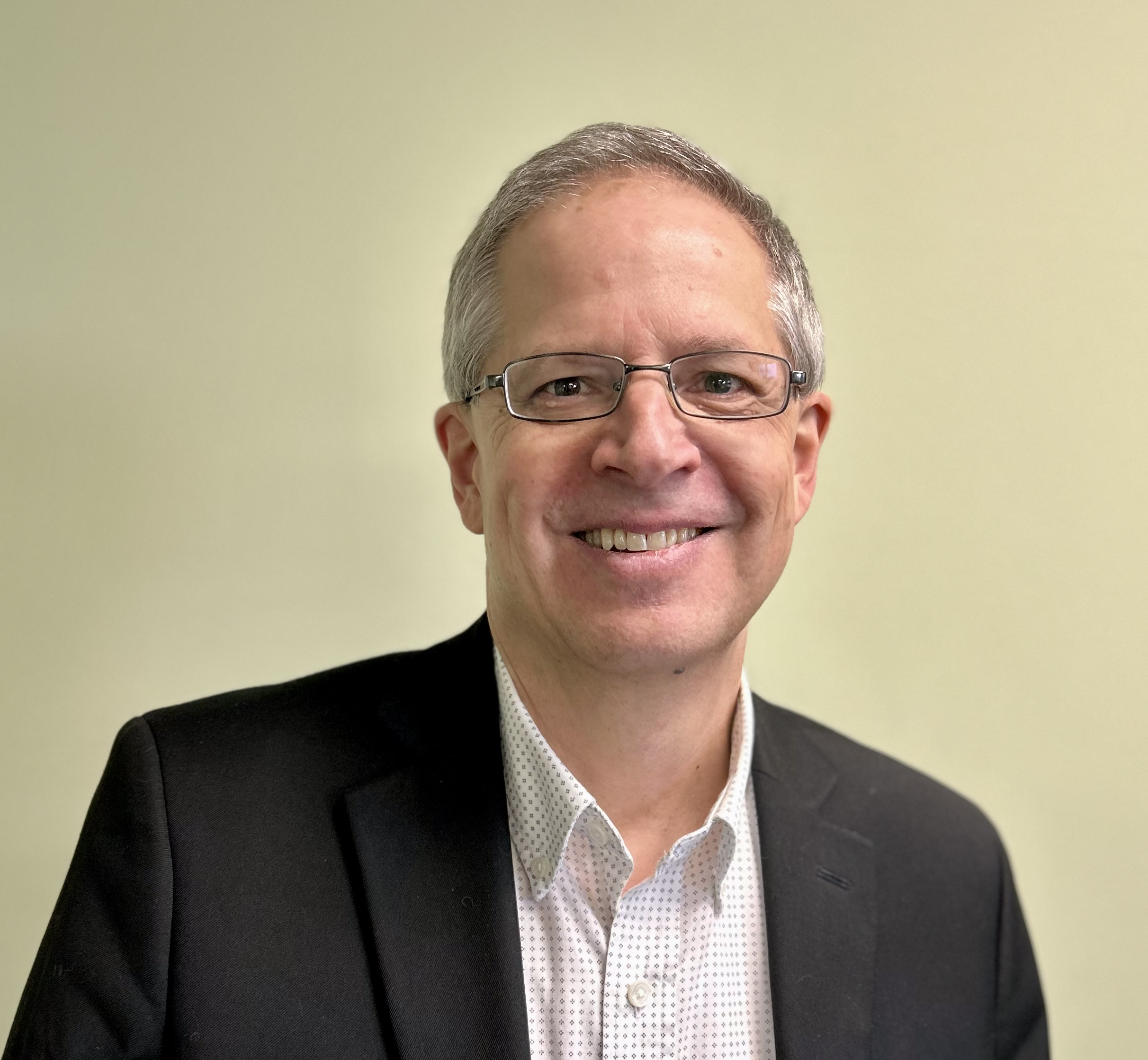
Dr Tim P. Vos

Tim P. Vos is an American academic and professor who specializes in journalism studies. He serves as the director of the Michigan State University School of Journalism and is the founder of the Center for Journalism Studies. Prior to joining Michigan State, Vos was chair of Journalism Studies at the Missouri School of Journalism. Vos is a Fellow of the International Communication Association (ICA) and a former president of the Association for Education in Journalism and Mass Communication (AEJMC).

Vos is recognized for his contributions to gatekeeping theory.

Vos completed his Ph.D. in Mass Communications from the S.I. Newhouse School of Public Communications at Syracuse University in 2005. He holds an M.A. in Journalism and Mass Communication from the University of Iowa and a B.A. in Political Studies and Philosophy, with a minor in Communication and Radio-TV, from Dordt College (now Dordt University).

In April 2025, Vos was named a 2025 inductee into the University of Iowa School of Journalism and Mass Communication (SCMJ) Hall of Fame, along with Isaiah Scales, in recognition of his outstanding contributions to the profession, the academy, and the Iowa journalism community.

== Selected publications ==
- Vos, T. P., ed. (2018). Journalism. Handbooks of Communication Science Series. Vol. 19. Berlin: de Gruyter Mouton. ISBN 978-1-5015-1038-0.
- Liebler, Carol M.; Vos, Tim P., eds. (2018). Media scholarship in a transitional age: Research in honor of Pamela J. Shoemaker. New York: Peter Lang. ISBN 9781433147722.
- Vos, T. P.; Heinderyckx, Francois, eds. (2015). Gatekeeping in transition. New York, London: Routledge Press. ISBN 9781138721012.
- Shoemaker, Pamela J.; Vos, Tim P. (2009). Gatekeeping theory. New York, London: Routledge Press. ISBN 978-0-415-98139-2.

Vos served as the editor of the book series Journalism in Perspective: Continuities and Disruptions, published by the University of Missouri Press, and now continues in the role as co-editor.
