= Karine Nahon =

Israeli information scientist

- קרין נהון
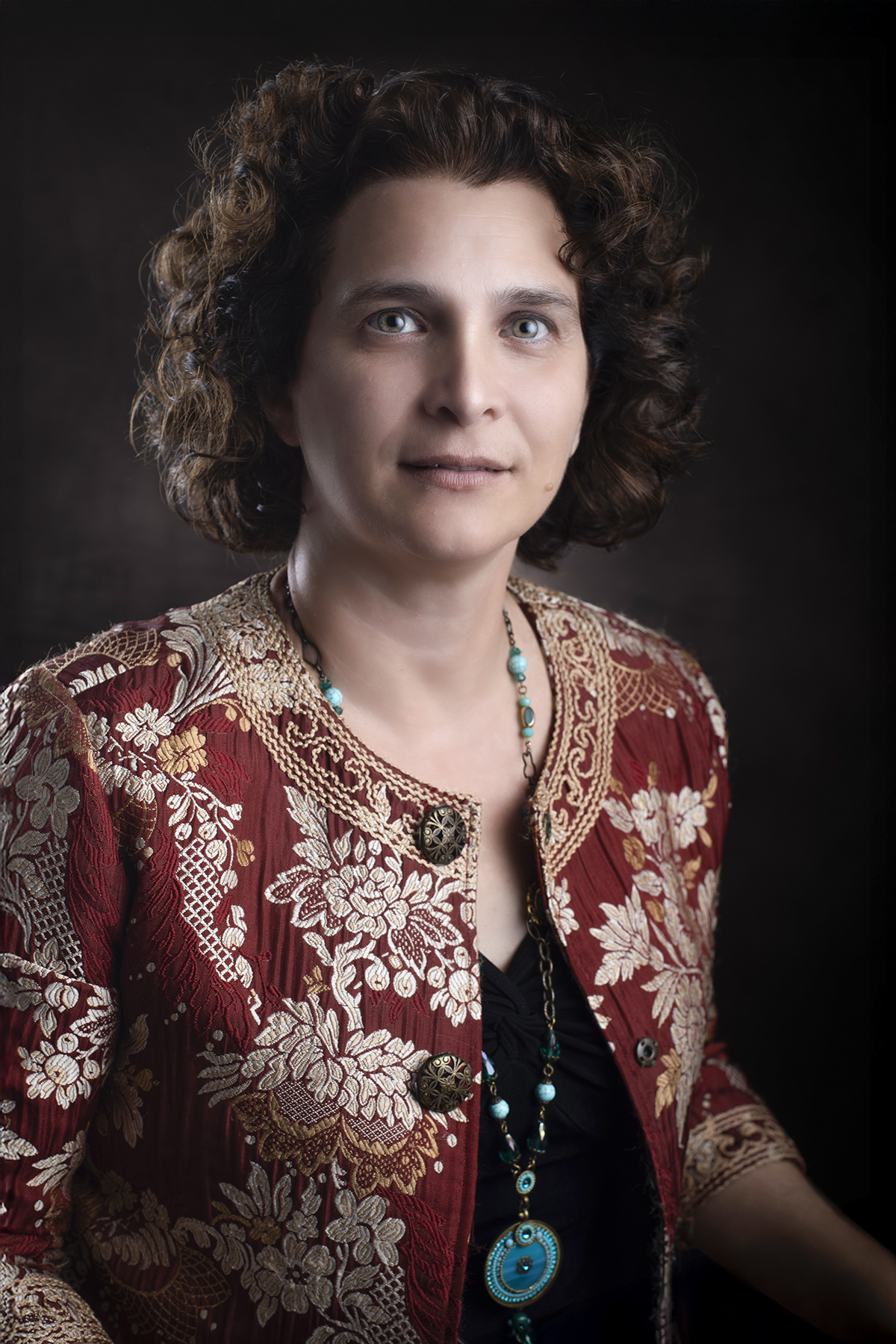
- Born: December 6, 1972 (age 53); Tel Aviv, Israel
- Education: Tel-Aviv University
- Occupations: Researcher, Information Scientist, Associate Professor and Public Activist
- Known for: Network gatekeeping theory
- Spouse: Michael Eitan
- Scientific career
- Fields: Information science, communication, political science
- Workplaces: University of Washington; Reichman University
- Website: eKarine.org

Karine Nahon (Hebrew: קרין נהון; born December 6, 1972) is an Israeli information scientist in the area of information, technology, and society. She holds a dual position as an associate professor in The Information School at University of Washington and at Reichman University. In July 2017, Nahon was named #24 on Forbes' list of 50 Most Influential Women in Israel. Her co-authored book "Going Viral" was awarded Best Information Science Book Award by the Association for Information Science and Technology and the 2014 Outstanding Academic Title Award by the American Library Association.

== Biography ==
Nahon was born in Tel Aviv to parents who immigrated from Lebanon before the outbreak of the Lebanese civil war. Her academic background is from various fields. She received a B.Sc. in computer science, B.A. in political science, and M.Sc. and Ph.D. in management of information systems from Tel Aviv University. She maintains a dual position as an associate professor faculty in the Information School at the University of Washington since 2004, and since 2010 in the Lauder School of Government, Diplomacy and Strategy at the Reichman University in Israel. At the University of Washington, she directs the Virality of Information research group. She is the first woman nominated to lead a track at the Hawaii International Conference on System Sciences.

In Israel, Nahon serves on the editorial board of the Freedom of Information Movement, Wikimedia, and the Internet Society. She is one of the leaders of the movement against the biometric database in Israel. The biometric database is still in its pilot phase, and Nahon appealed to the High Justice Court against its deployment.

Nahon was included in TheMarker's list of 100 most influential people in Israel, and was also placed in Forbes' list of 50 Most Influential Women in Israel.

== Work ==
Nahon has published over 80 research publications in her area of work. Her work synthesizes empirical research literature with a combination of information science, politics, sociology, and internet studies. Her studies on information and society focus on power and politics of information. In this domain, she has developed network gatekeeping theory and a framework of Information viralty.

== Network gatekeeping theory ==
Karine Nahon has written a number of contemporary pieces on gatekeeping theories between disciplines. In 2008, she proposed a new way of looking at gatekeeping, merging the disciplines' of communication, information science, and management perspectives into a refined theory of gatekeeping. Traditional mass communication gatekeeping theory has focused on how we get news, however Nahon's approach applies to all information.

Nahon also adds new terms and redefines old terms in the framework (pp. 1496 – 1497)

Gate – "entrance to or exit from a network or its sections."
Gatekeeping – "the process of controlling information as it moves through a gate. Activities include among others, selection, addition, withholding, display, channeling, shaping, manipulation, repetition, timing, localization, integration, disregard, and deletion of information."
Gated – "the entity subjected to gatekeeping"
Gatekeeping mechanism "a tool, technology, or methodology used to carry out the process of gatekeeping"
Network gatekeeper – "an entity (people, organizations, or governments) that has the discretion to exercise gatekeeping through a gatekeeping mechanism in networks and can choose the extent to which to exercise it contingent upon the gated standing."

This updated look at gatekeeping also poses a number of classifications including the bases for gatekeeping, mechanisms used in network gatekeeping, and types of authority of network gatekeepers.

Additionally, Nahon introduces a typology for the gated. According to her approach, the gated can have four key attributes at different levels that determine how they can interact with the gate. These are (p. 1501):

1. Political power in relation to the gatekeeper,
2. Information production ability,
3. Relationship with the gatekeeper,
4. And alternatives in the context of gatekeeping.

A typology of combinations of these characteristics then allows for evaluation of potential interactions between the gatekeeper and the gated based on the number and type of attributes an individual has. Her discussion about "the gated" resonates with audience gatekeeping in that both empowers the message recipients in the process of gatekeeping.

== Publications ==
- Nahon Karine and Hemsley Jeff, 2013, “Going Viral”, Polity. UK: Cambridge.
- Nahon Karine and Hemsley Jeff, 2014, “Political Blogs and Content: Homophily in the Guise of Cross-Linking”, American Behavioral Scientist (ABS), Vol. 58(10), pp. 1294–1313.
- Nahon Karine, Jeff Hemsley, Shawn Walker and Muzammil Hussain, 2011, “Fifteen Minutes of Fame: The Power of Blogs in the Lifecycle of Viral Political Information”, Policy & Internet, Vol. 3(1), Article 2.
- Nahon Karine, 2011, “Network Fuzziness of Inclusion/Exclusion”, International Journal of Communication (IJoC), Vol. 5, pp. 756–772.
- Barzilai-Nahon Karine, 2009, "Gatekeeping: A Critical Review", Annual Review of Information Science and Technology, Vol. 43, pp. 433–478.
- Barzilai-Nahon Karine, 2008, "Towards a Theory of Network Gatekeeping: A Framework for Exploring Information Control", Journal of the American Society for Information Science and Technology, Vol. 59(9), pp. 1493–1512.
- Barzilai-Nahon Karine, 2006, “Gaps and Bits: Conceptualizing Measurements for Digital Divide/s”, The Information Society, Vol. 22(5), pp. 269–278.
- Barzilai-Nahon Karine and Barzilai Gad, 2005, “Cultured Technology: Internet and Religious fundamentalism“, The Information Society, Vol. 21(1), pp. 25–40.
