= Pamela Shoemaker =

American academic (born 1950)

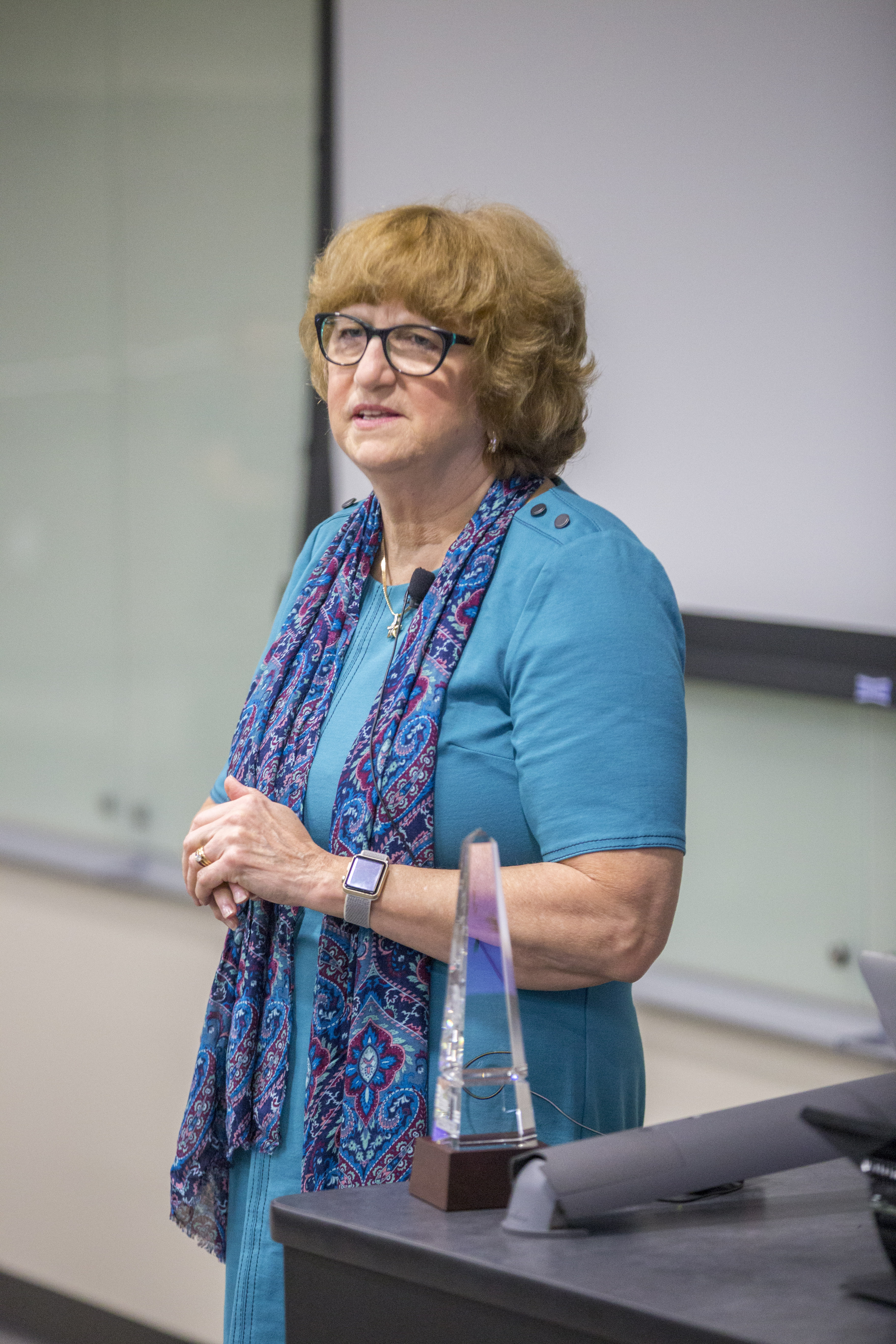
Shoemaker in 2017

Pamela J. Shoemaker (born October 25, 1950) is an American academic. She is a professor of communication and gatekeeping theorist.

From 1994 until her retirement in 2015, Shoemaker was the John Ben Snow Professor, an endowed research chair, in the S. I. Newhouse School of Public Communications at Syracuse University. She was previously the director of the School of Journalism at Ohio State University from 1991 to 1994, and earlier was on the faculty of the Department of Journalism at The University of Texas at Austin from 1982 to 1991.

Shoemaker holds an M.S. in communications and a B.S.J. in journalism from the E. W. Scripps School of Journalism at Ohio University (1972) and was named the L.J. Hortin Distinguished Alumna in 2006. In 2015 she received the Paul J. Deutschmann award for excellent research. She holds a PhD from the University of Wisconsin-Madison School of Journalism & Mass Communication, where she received the Harold L. Nelson award in 2017 for distinguished contribution to journalism and mass communication education.

Since 1997, Shoemaker has been editor (with Michael E. Roloff, Northwestern University) of Communication Research. Earlier she was associate editor of Journalism & Mass Communication Quarterly and has served on the editorial boards of several other academic journals.

== Selected publications ==
- Gatekeeping Theory (with Tim P. Vos, 2009) ISBN 978-0-415-98139-2
- News Around the World: Practitioners, Content, and the Public (with A. Cohen, 2006) ISBN 978-0-415-97506-3
- How to Build Social Science Theories (with J. Tankard and D. Lasorsa, 2004) ISBN 978-0-7619-2667-2
- Mediating the Message: Theories of Influences on Mass Media Content (with S. Reese, 1996) ISBN 978-0-8013-1251-9
- Gatekeeping (1991) ISBN 978-0-8039-4437-4
- Communication Campaigns About Drugs: Government, Media, and the Public (1989) ISBN 978-0-8058-0230-6
- Building a Theory of News Content (Journalism Monograph, 1987)

== See also ==
- Hierarchy of Influences, A model developed by Pamela Shoemaker
