= Gatekeeping (communication) =

Filtering process in communication

Gatekeeping is the process through which information is filtered for dissemination, whether for publication, broadcasting, the Internet, or some other mode of communication. The academic theory of gatekeeping may be found in multiple fields of study, including communication studies, journalism, political science, and sociology. Gatekeeping originally focused on the mass media with its few-to-many dynamic. Currently, the gatekeeping theory also addresses face-to-face communication and the many-to-many dynamic inherent on the Internet. Social psychologist Kurt Lewin first instituted Gatekeeping theory in 1943. Gatekeeping occurs at all levels of the media structure—from a reporter deciding which sources are presented in a headline story to editors choosing which stories are printed or covered. Including, but not limited to, media outlet owner and advertisers.

== Definition ==
Gatekeeping is a process by which information is filtered to the public by the media. According to Pamela Shoemaker and Tim Vos, gatekeeping is the "process of culling and crafting countless bits of information into the limited number of messages that reach people every day, and it is the center of the media's role in modern public life. [...] This process determines not only which information is selected, but also what the content and nature of the messages, such as news, will be."

1. In exercising its "surveillance" function, every news medium has a very large number of stories brought to its attention daily by reporters, wire services, and a variety of other sources.
2. Due to a number of practical considerations, only a limited amount of time or space is available in any medium for its daily presentations of the news to its audience. The remaining space must be devoted to advertising and other content.
3. Within any news organization there exists a news perspective, a subculture that includes a complex set of criteria for judging a particular news story – criteria based on economic needs of the medium, organizational policy, definitions of newsworthiness, conceptions of the nature of relevant audience, and beliefs about fourth estate obligations of journalists.
4. This news perspective and its complex criteria are used by editors, news directors, and other personnel who select a limited number of news stories for presentation to the public. They then encode them in ways such that the requirements of the medium and the tastes of the audience are met.
5. Therefore, personnel in the news organization become gatekeepers, letting some stories pass through the system but keeping others out. This then limits, controls, and shapes the public's knowledge of the totality of actual event occurring in reality."

== History ==
=== Origins of gatekeeping ===
Gatekeeping as a news process was identified in the literature as early as 1922, though not yet given a formal theoretical name. In his book 'The Immigrant Press', Robert Park explains the process, "out of all of the events that happen and are recorded every day by correspondents, reporters, and the news agencies, the editor chooses certain items for publication which he regards as more important or more interesting than others. The remainder he condemns to oblivion and the wastebasket. There is an enormous amount of news 'killed' every day" (p. 328).

Formally, gatekeeping was identified in Kurt Lewin's (1943) publication Forces Behind Food Habits and Methods of Change. Working during World War II, Lewin conducted field research initially among Midwestern housewives to determine how to effectively change their families' food consumption during this time of war. Lewin recognized that for food to go from a store or a garden to the dining table, there were various decision-making processes it had to pass on the way there. At a time when men were thought to control all household decisions, Lewin found that "food does not move by its own impetus. Entering or not entering a channel and moving from one section of a channel to another is affected by a 'gatekeeper'" (p. 37). The gatekeeper, in this case, was typically the housewife, or sometimes a maid in more affluent households. Lewin's research demonstrated that not all members of a family have equal weight in making household food decisions and that the wife, who typically shops for and prepares the food controls the gates, based on a variety of considerations. Lewin's study published in 1943 became the impetus for another article in 1947 in which he introduces the idea of feedback in group decision making, which complicates the role of the gatekeeper. Feedback acknowledges that the set of considerations a gatekeeper uses in making decisions may vary depending on considerations of the group.

In 1950, David Manning White, a journalism professor at Boston University, looked at the factors an editor takes into consideration when deciding which news will make the paper and which news will not; intending to examine how a "gate keeper" examines his "gate" within a channel of mass communication. White contacted an editor, a man in his mid-40s with 25 years of experience, whom he calls "Mr. Gates." Mr. Gates was the wire editor of a morning newspaper in a mid-west city of 100,000 that had a circulation of 30,000. During the case study, Mr. Gates retained all copy that he rejected from the paper for a week. At the end of his shift, he made notes on why that story was rejected, assuming he could still remember the reason.

At the end of the week that the study took place, White found that nine-tenths of the wire copy got rejected and the process is made by highly subjective decisions based on the editor's own set of experiences, attitudes and expectations. White found that in this particular study, the majority of the rejections could be classified in two ways: 1) not worthy of being reported or 2) there was another story on the same event. Pertaining to the first reason, many of the explanations Mr. Gates gives for rejection are "highly-subjective value judgments." Examples of this are seen when Mr. Gates writes "too Red" or "don't care for suicides" (386). Pertaining to the second reason of rejection, given for the majority of the rejections, Mr. Gates made no "personal" rejections to the copy, but there was simply no space available for it in the paper. The later the story came to Mr. Gates, the less of a chance it had to take up any valuable space remaining.

White examined Mr. Gates' performance for a specific day and put the data in tables which show the amount and type of news which appeared on the front pages and the total number of dispatches used. Mr. Gates admitted to preferring political news to other types of news and explained that he tries to avoid sensationalism and consistently leans more towards being "conservative" both in political views and in writing style. Observed patterns throughout the week also show that Mr. Gates leans away from stories filled with figures and statistics and prefers stories that contain more of a narrative. His notes and reasons for rejection can also show Mr. Gates' writing standard, using "too vague," "not interesting," and "dull writing" on a number of occasions. A question that White poses and says should be considered in this case study is, "Does the category really enter into the choice?"

He concludes that as Mr. Gates is representing "gate keepers" and wire editors as a whole, there doesn't seem to be a particular choice of news by categories. During the week the case study took place, however, there was a strong emphasis on "Human Interest" stories because there was a large appeal to a story regarding a Cardinal of the Catholic Church. Mr. Gates also concludes that the gate keeper's standards and taste should refer back to the audience and that they are the ones being served and pleased. His concluding remarks provide a great summary of the purpose and findings of the study. "Through studying his overt reasons for rejecting news stories from the press associations we see how highly subjective, how based on the "gate keeper's" own set of experiences, attitudes and expectations the communication of "news" really is" (390).

=== Gatekeeping in the 21st century ===
More than fifty years after White's Mr. Gates study, in 2001, Pamela Shoemaker, Martin Eichholz, Eunyi Kim, and Brenda Wrigley studied the forces in news gatekeeping in relation to coverage of Congressional bills. More specifically, they were interested in two hypotheses: 1) the routine gatekeeping force of assessing a bill's newsworthiness will be related to how prominently a bill is covered, and 2) the individual journalistic forces (education, political ideology, work experience, ethnicity, gender, voting behavior) will be related to how prominently a bill is covered. They also predicted that the newsworthiness of a bill would be more important than journalists' personal characteristics. Surveying both journalists (for their personal characteristics) and editors (for evaluating newsworthiness), Shoemaker and her colleagues found that only newsworthiness had a significant effect on the amount of coverage given to a bill, thus their first hypothesis was supported as well as the idea that newsworthiness would be more important than personal characteristics.

While Shoemaker et al.'s study focused on traditional news rooms, media scholar Jane Singer has been interested in how gatekeeping translates to how traditional newspapers use online tools. In both the 2000 and 2004 Presidential elections, she studied how the Internet was changing the process for newspapers, contending that, "the power of gatekeepers seems to diminish in a modern information society. The Internet defies the whole notion of a 'gate' and challenges the idea that journalists (or anyone else) can or should limit what passes through it" (p. 265). In the study of the 2004 coverage, Singer posed the following research questions: 1) What did editors of websites affiliated with major newspapers see as their goals and their most noteworthy achievements in covering the 2004 political campaign and election? 2) To what extent did these editors relinquish their gatekeeping role by providing opportunities for users to provide or personalize content? And more broadly, 3) In what ways have the views of editors of websites affiliated with major newspapers changed since 2000?

Singer found that the content which appears in online editions of newspapers mostly comes from content that appears in the print versions. However, editors were also very proud of the interactive tools on their websites that could not be in the paper. The goal of most editors was after all to inform the public. Further, journalists were beginning to take a step back from their traditional gatekeeping role such that many websites had sections in which journalists provided baseline information and users could manipulate according to their needs and interests like interactive maps, Electoral College scenarios, and ballot building tools based on zip codes. In 2000, editors were likely to boast about how quickly they could publish returns on election night. In 2004, this was no longer the case, as it was standard practice by then. Further, their stated goal for the 2008 election cycle was to let the audience guide the coverage.

== Network gatekeeping theory ==
Karine Barzilai-Nahon has written a number of contemporary pieces on gatekeeping theories between disciplines. In 2008, she proposed a new way of looking at gatekeeping, merging the disciplines' of communication, information science, and management perspectives into a refined theory of gatekeeping. Traditional mass communication gatekeeping theory has focused on how we get news, however Barzilai-Nahon's approach applies to all information.

Barzilai-Nahon also adds new terms and redefines old terms in the framework (pp. 1496 – 1497)

Gate – "entrance to or exit from a network or its sections."
Gatekeeping – "the process of controlling information as it moves through a gate. Activities include among others, selection, addition, withholding, display, channeling, shaping, manipulation, repetition, timing, localization, integration, disregard, and deletion of information."
Gated – "the entity subjected to gatekeeping"
Gatekeeping mechanism – "a tool, technology, or methodology used to carry out the process of gatekeeping"
Network gatekeeper – "an entity (people, organizations, or governments) that has the discretion to exercise gatekeeping through a gatekeeping mechanism in networks and can choose the extent to which to exercise it contingent upon the gated standing."

This updated look at gatekeeping also poses a number of classifications including the bases for gatekeeping, mechanisms used in network gatekeeping, and types of authority of network gatekeepers.

Additionally, Barzilai-Nahon introduces a typology for the gated. According to her approach, the gated can have four key attributes at different levels that determine how they can interact with the gate. These are (p. 1501):

1. Political power in relation to the gatekeeper,
2. Information production ability,
3. Relationship with the gatekeeper,
4. And alternatives in the context of gatekeeping.

A typology of combinations of these characteristics then allows for evaluation of potential interactions between the gatekeeper and the gated based on the number and type of attributes an individual has. Her discussion about "the gated" resonates with audience gatekeeping in that both empowers the message recipients in the process of gatekeeping.

The process of gatekeeping has extended from the traditional act of deciding what news is the best news but information in general. According to Marcelo Thompson, there are actors called intermediaries that are involved with the architecture of information we come in contact with. They are making decisions about the structure as well as the content of our information. These decisions make these intermediaries technological gatekeepers. This provision of information for an organization's member as well as those outside that organization is less about Agenda Setting media outcomes but a practical approach to usability. An example of this role would be a content manager for a company's knowledge database. All of the articles and reference materials are curated and updated by these managers. While they may work in teams with oversight, the fact remains that decision are made about the content that will exist on the site and how it is displayed.

== Audience gatekeeping ==
In online environment, users have begun playing a greater role in producing and (re)distributing online news items via social media such as Twitter and Facebook. Shoemaker and Vos (2011) theorized such practice as "audience gatekeeping". According to them (2011), audience gatekeeping is the process in which users "pass along already available news items and comment on them" based on the user's own set of criteria about the newsworthiness" (p. 113). Kwon et al. (2013) adapted the theory of audience gatekeeping to explore what channels are mainly adopted for Twitter audiences to filter and share news contents. The notion of audience gatekeeping consists with Luke Goode's (2009) discussion on metajournalism, whereby users' role in reprocessing and rebroadcasting the existing online contents are as equally emphasized as users' original creation in nurturing citizen journalism as reshaping the existing hierarchy of the journalism system. Kwon et al. (2013) also found that re-processed news items by user-generated content websites, or social media, are more frequently adopted by Twitter users than the direct news times from traditional mass media organizations, confirming the empowering role of ordinary online users in retelling and redistributing news agendas to networked publics.

=== Gatekeeping evolved by the audience ===
After a user decides to share news with its network, way-finding commences — a journey, or guided tour, from a user's arrival on the web, to their site and the information that the user is looking for. The metaphor is borrowed from architects and planners. They design systems for users to navigate from place to place. Along with directional cues, education and even delight are designed in to the plans. This is not dissimilar to what media planners are doing today. The user arrives online in a crowded city of information. As they type onto a search engine they begin to navigate the online space. From a purely gatekeeping perspective, information and news was the destination. Users went directly to the place they expected to find what they were looking for. Today, a user inputs what they want to learn about. The various sources are in competition for the user's attention. Using marketing techniques, the source will hopefully grab the attention of the user and then lead them to the content they're searching for.

== New gatekeepers ==
It has been established that journalists are attempting to meet the needs of their audience. They identify news and then report it. It's this identification process that we find traditional gatekeeping. In the discussion of media gatekeeping is a debate between traditional journalism and the blogging community. Political bloggers have increased their audience as well as their scope of activities and ambition. Schiffer considers it an alternative form of journalism that can possess traditional journalism's sought-after qualities while omitting some of its drawbacks. The main criticism of traditional journalism is the lack of control by the user over the content they are presented with. Blogging utilizes the community to perform a type of collective editing. As consumers interact with the blog and each other on its behalf, the popular grows calling more consumers into the fold. While this will certainly allow the user to decide for itself what news needs to be out front, the blogging has its limitations as well. Because anyone can blog and can do so without editing from above with professional standards from the trade-craft, filtering the information down to its most essential components is often overlooked. Differences between traditional journalists and bloggers aside the main similarity is that both parties have to decide what is news-worthy and then report it.

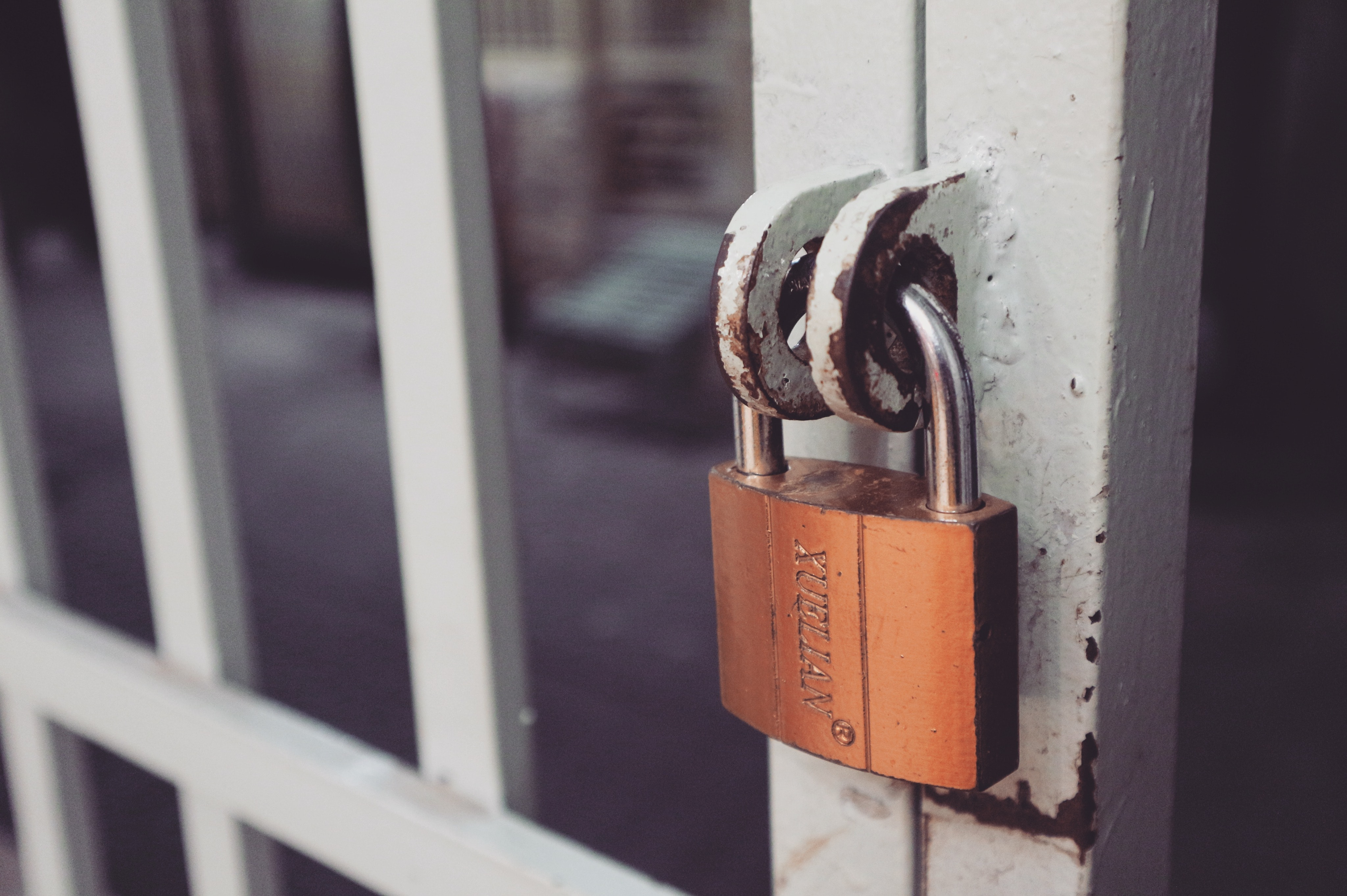
Gatekeeping concept

Schiffer also found that user-created content creators utilize a type of gate-keeping as it concerns the comments on their publications. Some bloggers require approval by a moderator before comments can be added to a post. At times comments are disabled altogether. This means that bloggers are not only gatekeeping the content they output but the on-page discussion around that submission. Larger media organization with an online presence have the same capability as it is associated with the technology and not the host.

=== Gatekeeping found in social media ===
A rise in social media popularity has sparked reliance on media outlets to produce newsworthy content. As newspaper distribution rates drop, news outlets rely heavily on social media editors to promote news items. Kasper Welbers and Michaël Opgenhaffen take a deeper look at social media gatekeeping through an analysis of news outlets' influence on public social media. As news outlets transition into the digital age, journalists and 'specialized social media experts' have adapted to fill holes in traditional news distribution. What makes social media so formidable lies in the diffusion process of user engagement, primarily seen through likes, shares, comments, and reposts. Ease of access when sharing news links through social media plug-ins on websites and apps furthers the widespread availability of new distributions, causing an "increasingly complex relationships between news production and consumption" (pp. 4729). Welbers and Opgenhaffen build off of gatekeeping theory by defining two new channels that correlate to the influence news outlets have over the media. The social media editor channel (Barzilai-Nahon, 2008; Shoemaker and Vos, 2009) refers to the origin of news information on social media, referring to its original publication by specialized social media news experts. Likewise, the alternative channel refers to all other ways news items enter public mainstream circulation. Measurement of these channels dictates how news items enter social media through either newspapers or news outlets. Lewin's (1947) first task to uncovering gatekeepers is finding out who the original gatekeepers are. In this case, social media editors can be coined as influential gatekeepers. Origins of gatekeepers clash as either channel becomes blurred by intersections between social media editors and individual users, thus making it difficult to determine the definition of gatekeeping throughout social media.

Some fear that modern social media content has become increasingly monitored and gatekept, which in turn has allowed for agendas to be pushed, undermining the role of the fourth estate. This can prove to be quite dangerous, as an audience's selective exposure to certain news media can skew perceptions, lessen the diversity of ideals and reinforce prejudices.

=== Gatekeeping in politics ===
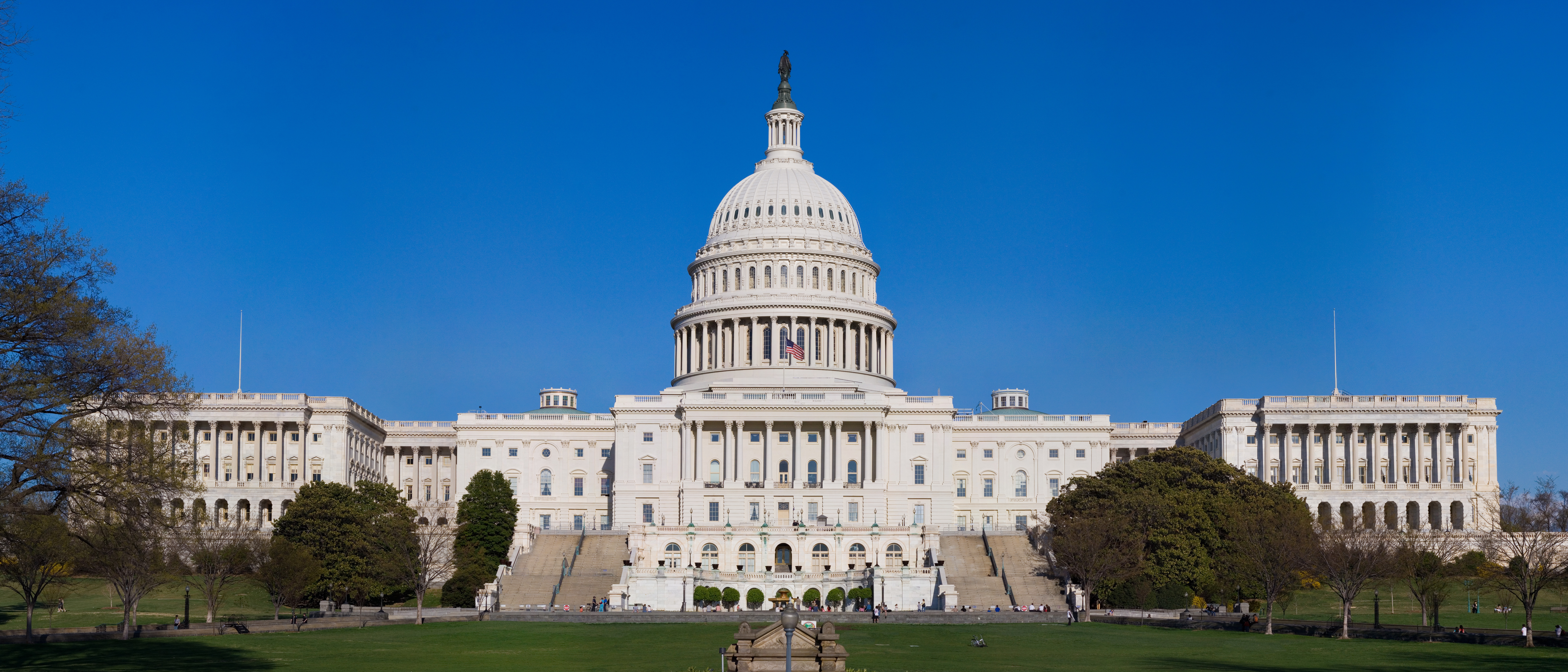
The United States Capitol Building

Many modern political institutions follow a chain of command in which first-stage players (such as chief executives in presidential systems and/or prime ministers in parliamentary governments) have a procedural-right to hinder second-stage players from participating in collective choice; this is known as Political Gatekeeping. Gatekeeping practices include attaching riders (provisions) to bills and the House's ability to enforce rules that expedite consideration of otherwise blocked legislation, as in the case of combatting a filibuster. Political Gatekeeping also manifests in the form of selective candidacy, where established government officials hand-pick which running candidates to promote, while restricting resources/support for unwelcome candidates.

=== "Gatewatching" ===
The term "gatewatching", coined by Axel Bruns (2005), refers to "gatekeeping as a concept in the digital era" (Vos, 2015). Bruns argued that gatekeeping did not accurately describe the process in which news currently flows between participants and public circulation. Influencers and individuals who share news "do not keep gates of their own", but instead share news and media to their respected social followers.

== Five criteria of choosing a news story ==
According to American political scientist Doris Graber, journalists rely on the five criteria when choosing a news story.

- The first criterion is strong impact. Local stories impact the public more than unfamiliar international events. In order to attract attention, journalists inflate news and present them as situations that could happen to anyone. They turn rare international crises into everyday scenarios, personalizing stories and losing the main significance of them.
- Violence, conflict, disaster, or scandal is the second criterion. Topics such as murders, wars, shootings, or hurricanes captivate the attention of the audience. Newspapers containing violence outsold other newspaper chains that contained less violence.
- The third criterion is familiarity. News stories gain more attention if they have issues pertaining to the public or if they include familiar situations concerning a large audience. Journalists try to turn international events or crises into stories that can relate back to their current audience. People tend to retain a lot of information about celebrities and tend to care about the personal intimacy of other's lives. They value the traits and attributes of others and may try to relate to them in many ways. News about a celebrity's or president's death may resonate on a deeper level, allowing certain events to remain in the memory much longer.
- Proximity is the fourth element. People prefer news that is local, close in proximity. People pay closer attention to local news than they do to international or national affairs. Local media outlets do well because they focus most of their stories on local events, about seventy-five percent. There is a strong preference for local news over international and national news.
- The fifth element is timeliness and novelty. News should be something interesting that does not occur every day or an event that is not a part of people's lives. Events such as hurricanes or new store openings capture the attention of many.

== Influence of criteria ==
The news criteria pressure journalists and news outlets to frequently publish new stories, in order to stay current on events. Reporters attend local events in order to get stories quickly and easily. When events are difficult to report on, journalists resort to interviews or experts of the event or field. The five criteria dictate which events are chosen and which events to spend money on to report. The size of a newspaper also dictates which stories to publish and which ones to skip. Once stories reach news outlets, editors must determine which stories to select. Editors do not spend much time choosing stories. An average editor must choose stories in seconds. Investigative or complex stories are covered by TV sources and radio. Those types of stories go towards television and radio because they have more time to dedicate to the stories. They can describe the event, background, and causes in depth. The size of the paper and the pressure editors have may cause bias in the audience's perspective. Stories containing the five criterion almost always make the front page of the news. The frequent representation of those types of stories often leads to skewness from the public.

== See also ==
- Propaganda model
- Censorship
- Gatekeeper
- Mindguard
- Institutional memory
- Media bias
- Narcissism
- Overton window
- Spin, 1995 documentary using captured raw satellite feeds to illustrate television news gatekeeping and censorship
