= Ramon J. Aldag =

American management academic

- Born: 1945
- Occupations: Academic, professor
- Known for: Research in organizational behavior and group decision-making; 47th President of the Academy of Management
- Title: Glen A. Skillrud Family Chair in Business (emeritus)

Ramon J. "Ray" Aldag (born 1945 in Beccles, Suffolk, England) is an American academic and professor emeritus of management and human resources at the University of Wisconsin-Madison Wisconsin School of Business, where he held the Glen A. Skillrud Family Chair in Business. He is known for his research in organizational behavior, group decision-making processes (including a major reappraisal of groupthink), and for serving as the 47th president of the Academy of Management (1991-1992).

== Early life and education ==
Aldag received a B.S. in mechanical engineering (1966), an M.B.A. in production management (1968), and a Ph.D. in management (1974), all from Michigan State University.

== Career ==
Early in his career, Aldag worked as a thermal engineer on Apollo and Voyager projects, including the Lunar Roving Vehicle and the Passive Seismometer, at the Bendix Aerospace Division in Ann Arbor, Michigan.

Aldag joined the University of Wisconsin-Madison faculty in 1973 and taught there for 50 years until retiring in summer 2023. He served as chair of the Department of Management and Human Resources, executive director of the Weinert Center for Entrepreneurship (2002-2012), and associate director of the Industrial Relations Research Institute. He served on the UW-Madison Academic Planning Council and the UW-Madison Health Care Advisory Committee.

His teaching and research have addressed behavioral decision making, entrepreneurship, leadership, organizational behavior and culture, change, stress and coping, group decision processes, task design, computerized decision aids, negotiations, and motivation. His international experience includes teaching summers at the Chinese Academy of Sciences in Beijing.

== Leadership and service ==
Aldag was elected the 47th president of the Academy of Management (1991-1992), the primary professional association for management scholars in more than 120 countries worldwide. He previously served as president of the Midwest Academy of Management and later as Dean of the Academy’s Fellows, the Academy’s honorary society. He has chaired or served on more than 90 Ph.D. thesis committees and currently serves on the editorial review boards of leading journals, including the Academy of Management Review, Administrative Science Quarterly, and the Journal of Applied Psychology. He is the founding Editor of the Henry Stewart Talks Organizational Behavior Video Series and the founding Editor-in-Chief of the Oxford Research Encyclopedia in Business and Management.

He received the Jerrod Distinguished Service Award from the University of Wisconsin-Madison in 1993 and the Distinguished Service Award from the Academy of Management in 1995. He is listed in Who's Who in America and Who's Who in the World and received the Alfred Nelson Marcus Lifetime Achievement Award.

== Research and publications ==
Aldag has co-authored nine books and published more than 85 journal articles and book chapters. His work is frequently cited in organizational behavior, social issues, and decision-making research. Highly cited papers include studies on role conflict and ambiguity (with Randall S. Schuler and Arthur P. Brief) and a reappraisal of groupthink (with Sally R. Fuller).

=== Selected publications ===
- Tosi, Henry; Aldag, Ramon J.; Storey, Ronald G. (1973). "On the measurement of the environment: An assessment of the Lawrence and Lorsch Environmental Uncertainty Subscale". Administrative Science Quarterly. 18 (1): 27–36. doi:10.2307/2391925.
- Brief, Arthur P.; Aldag, Ramon J. (1977). "The Intrinsic-extrinsic dichotomy: Toward conceptual clarity". Academy of Management Review. 2 (3): 496–500. doi:10.5465/amr.1977.4281861.
- Schuler, Randall S.; Aldag, Ramon J.; Brief, Arthur P. (1977). "Role conflict and ambiguity: A scale analysis". Organizational Behavior and Human Performance. 20 (1): 111–128. doi:10.1016/0030-5073(77)90047-2.
- Aldag, Ramon J.; Fuller, Sally R. (1993). "Beyond fiasco: A reappraisal of the groupthink phenomenon and a new model of group decision processes". Psychological Bulletin. 113 (3): 533–552. doi:10.1037/0033-2909.113.3.533.
- Aldag, Ramon J.; Kuzuhara, Loren W. (2015). Creating High Performance Teams: Applied Strategies and Tools for Managers and Team Members. Routledge. ISBN 978-0-415-53841-1.
- Aldag, Ramon J. (2022). "Groupthink - a monument to truthiness?". The Psychologist. 35: 36–40.
