= Irving Janis =

American psychologist (1918–1990)

- Born: May 26, 1918; Buffalo, New York, U.S.
- Died: November 15, 1990 (aged 72); Santa Rosa, California, U.S.
- Education: University of Chicago (BS); Columbia University (PhD)
- Employer: Yale University
- Spouse: Marjorie Janis
- Children: 2
- Scientific career
- Fields: Psychology
- Thesis: Psychological effects of electric convulsive treatments (1950)

Irving Lester Janis (May 26, 1918 – November 15, 1990) was an American research psychologist at Yale University and a professor emeritus at the University of California, Berkeley most famous for his theory of "groupthink", which described the systematic errors made by groups when making collective decisions. A Review of General Psychology survey, published in 2002, ranked Janis as the 79th most cited psychologist of the 20th century.

== Early years ==
Irving Janis was born on May 26, 1918, in Buffalo, New York. He received a Bachelor of Science degree from the University of Chicago in 1939, then received a Doctor of Philosophy in psychology from Columbia University in 1950.

== Career ==
During the Second World War, Janis was drafted into the U.S. Army, where he carried out studies of military morale. In 1947, Janis became a faculty member of the Yale University Psychology Department, where he remained for nearly forty years. He collaborated with Carl Hovland on his studies of attitude change, including the sleeper effect.

During his career, Janis studied decisionmaking in areas such as dieting and smoking. This work described how people respond to threats, as well as what conditions give rise to irrational complacency, apathy, hopelessness, rigidity, and panic.

Janis also made important contributions to the study of group dynamics. He did extensive work in the area of "groupthink," which describes the tendency of groups to try to minimize conflict and reach consensus without sufficiently testing, analyzing, and evaluating their ideas. His work suggested that pressures for conformity restrict the thinking of the group, bias its analysis, promote simplistic and stereotyped thinking, and stifle individual creative and independent thought.

Janis wrote or co-wrote more than a dozen books, including Psychological Stress (1958), Victims of Groupthink (1972), Decision Making (1977), Groupthink (1982), and Crucial Decisions (1989).

In 1967, Janis was awarded the Socio-Psychological Prize by the American Association for the Advancement of Science. In 1981, he received the Distinguished Scientific Contribution Award of the American Psychological Association. In 1991, he won the Distinguished Scientist Award from the Society of Experimental Social Psychology.

He retired from Yale University in 1985, and in 1986 was appointed adjunct professor of Psychology Emeritus at the University of California, Berkeley.

== Personal life ==
Janis' father, Martin Janis, owned an art gallery in Los Angeles. His uncle was the pioneering art dealer Sidney Janis. Irving Janis was married to Marjorie Janis, with whom he had two daughters. He died of lung cancer on November 15, 1990, in Santa Rosa, California.

== Selected books ==
- Hovland, Carl Iver; Janis, Irving L.; Kelley, Harold H. (1953). Communication and persuasion; psychological studies of opinion change. New Haven: Yale University Press. OCLC 187639.
- Janis, Irving L. (1958). Psychological stress; psychoanalytic and behavioral studies of surgical patients. New York: Wiley. OCLC 14620125.
- Janis, Irving L. (1959). Personality and persuasibility. New Haven: Yale University Press. OCLC 224637.
- Janis, Irving L. (1969). Personality: dynamics, development, and assessment. New York: Harcourt, Brace & World. ISBN 978-0-15-569585-6.
- Janis, Irving L. (1972). Victims of groupthink; a psychological study of foreign-policy decisions and fiascoes. Boston: Houghton, Mifflin. ISBN 978-0-395-14002-4.
- Janis, Irving L.; Mann, Leon (1977). Decision making: a psychological analysis of conflict, choice, and commitment. New York: Free Press. ISBN 978-0-02-916160-9.
- Wheeler, Daniel D.; Janis, Irving L. (1980). A practical guide for making decisions. New York: Free Press. ISBN 978-0-02-934460-6.
- Janis, Irving L. (1982). Counseling on personal decisions: theory and research on short-term helping relationships. New Haven: Yale University Press. ISBN 978-0-300-02484-5.
- Janis, Irving L. (1982). Groupthink: psychological studies of policy decisions and fiascoes. Boston: Houghton Mifflin. ISBN 978-0-395-31704-4.
- Janis, Irving L. (1982). Stress, attitudes, and decisions: selected papers. New York: Praeger. ISBN 978-0-03-059036-8.
- Janis, Irving L. (1989). Crucial decisions: leadership in policymaking and crisis management. New York: Free Press. ISBN 978-0-02-916161-6.
