= Reality testing =

Psychotherapeutic function

Reality testing is the psychotherapeutic function by which the objective or real world and one's relationship to it are reflected on and evaluated by the observer. This process of distinguishing the internal world of thoughts and feelings from the external world is a technique commonly used in psychoanalysis and behavior therapy, and was originally devised by Sigmund Freud.

== Purpose ==
Within psychotherapy and counseling settings, practitioners use reality testing to influence the patient or client to recognize their negative thoughts, evaluate the thoughts logically rather than emotionally, and then determine whether the thoughts are valid (i.e., internally consistent and grounded in reality). The focus of reality testing is not necessarily concentrated on the source of the behavior or thought, but rather on the fact that current thoughts are occurring and influencing behaviors in the here-and-now. After undergoing this technique, the patient or client is often able to see that the thoughts they have been experiencing are, in fact, not valid or based on reality, and therefore should not be used as the basis for life decisions.

Reality testing can be used in this way to help facilitate corrective emotional experiences by disconfirming and altering previously held negative or unrealistic expectations in favor of more adaptive functions. Psychotherapy methods such as rational emotive behavior therapy and cognitive behavioral therapy rely heavily on the client's ability to frequently self-examine internal thoughts and assess their preceding influence on perceptions, judgments, and behaviors.

Continual reality testing directed by therapists can help educate clients on how to habitually examine their own thought patterns and behaviors without the ongoing need for a therapist. Constant and prolonged exposure to a multitude of corrective experiences can lead clients to form their own internal and enduring changes in thoughts, expectations, feelings, and behavior. Reality testing has also been identified as a curative factor when implemented within a group therapy setting. In group counseling, clients can use the perspectives of other group members as the basis of reality testing and receive instant feedback through group discussions, roleplaying, and other group activities.

== Characteristics ==
Therapists using reality testing techniques typically rely upon the client's mental processes of attention, perception, memory, and judgment in order to help guide them to the formation of logical conclusions about how their internal experiences are related to external reality. Limited reality testing capabilities can sometimes be a function of a mental disorder. People exhibiting limited reality testing might lack the insight and ability to distinguish between the external and internal world as a factor of psychosis. For example, hallucinations and delusions are often taken as signs of a failure of reality testing.

Reality testing has been identified as being one of the common therapeutic principles of change. Principles of change are shared by all theoretic orientations of therapy, and include strategies such as: promoting client belief in the effectiveness of therapy, the formation and maintenance of a therapeutic alliance with the client, facilitating client awareness of the factors influencing their problems, and encouraging the client to engage in corrective experiences.

Emphasizing ongoing reality testing in the client's life has been demonstrated to be among the principles of change that can be used to explain and account for the underlying effectiveness of therapeutic counseling techniques, regardless of theoretical ideals. For this reason, aspects of reality testing can be incorporated in a variety of therapeutic treatment plans.

== See also ==
- Reality therapy
- Cognitive behavioral therapy
- Rational emotive therapy
- Counseling psychology
