= Citroën Jumpy =

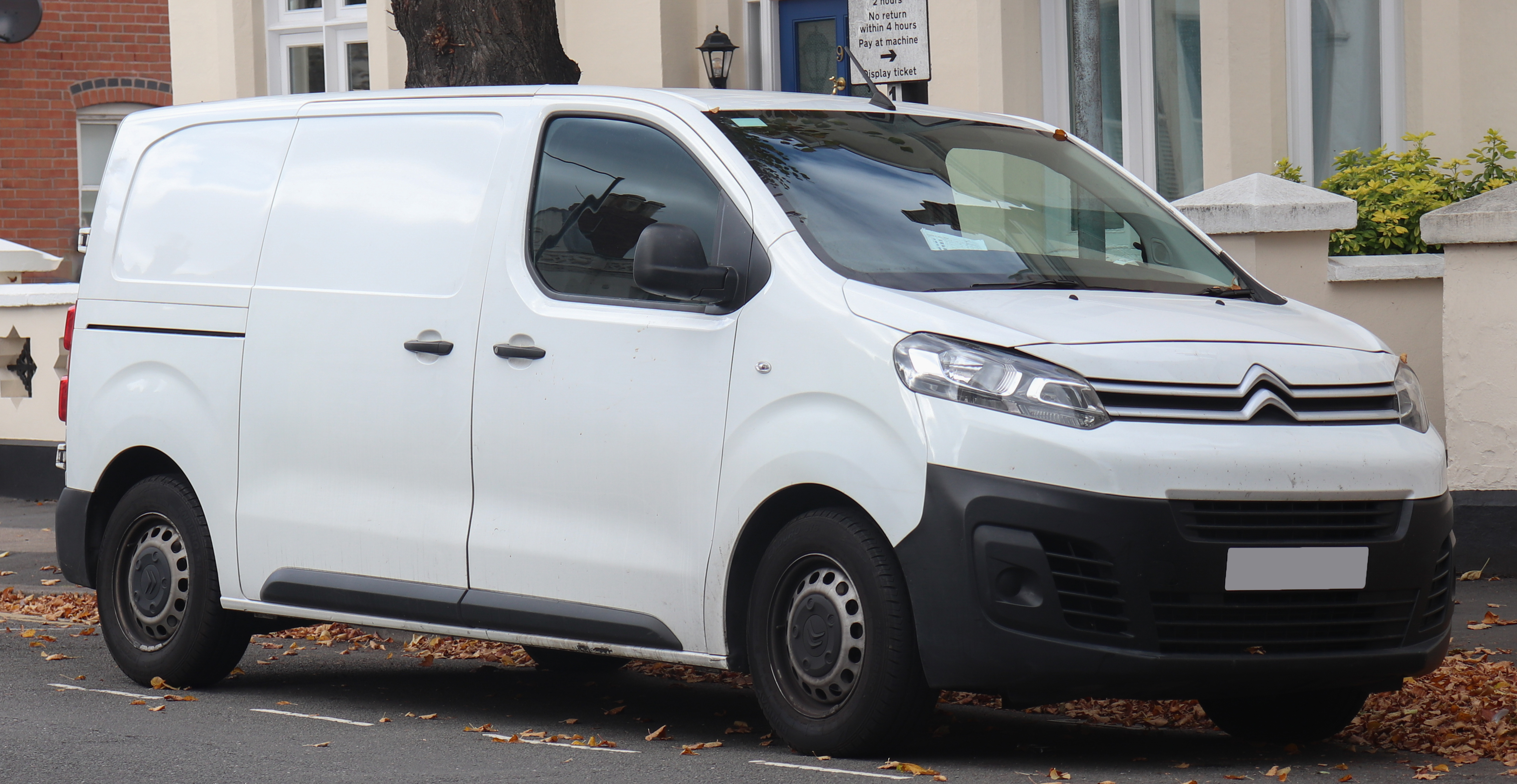

Overview
- Manufacturer: Sevel Nord; Stellantis (2021–present)
- Production: 1994–present

Body and chassis
- Class: Light commercial vehicle Large MPV
- Body style: 4/5-door panel van 4/5-door minivan
- Layout: Front-engine, front-wheel-drive

Chronology
- Predecessor: Citroën C25; Citroën C35; Toyota HiAce (for Toyota Proace); Fiat Talento (for Fiat Scudo); Eurovans; Renault Trafic (for the basis of the Opel/Vauxhall Vivaro); Fiat Doblò (for the basis of the Ram ProMaster City)

The Citroën Jumpy (badged Citroën Dispatch in some countries) is a light commercial van jointly developed by FCA Italy and PSA Group and, since 2021, Stellantis. The Jumpy is also sold as the Peugeot Expert, Fiat Scudo, Opel Vivaro, and Toyota ProAce. They were previously built by Sevel, a joint venture created in 1994 by the two companies.

All three models were facelifted in March 2004 before being replaced by new, second-generation models in 2007. The redesigned models again shared the same design and engineering, with subtle trim changes between each brand. The second generation received a small facelift in February 2012 and from July 2013, Toyota began sales of a rebadged version called the Toyota Proace.

In December 2015, Citroën, Peugeot and Toyota unveiled their new generation of these vehicles in people carrying-specifications called the Citroën SpaceTourer and Peugeot Traveller, with Toyota retaining the Proace name. The commercial versions premiered later, retaining the Peugeot Expert and Citroën Jumpy names.

In May 2016, the Fiat Scudo was replaced by a second generation of the Fiat Talento, a rebadged Renault Trafic. From the 2019 model year, the Jumpy has also been rebadged as the Opel/Vauxhall Vivaro, replacing the previous Vivaro model, which, from 2001 to 2019, had been based on the Renault Trafic. From the 2022 model year, the Jumpy has also been rebadged as the Fiat Scudo, to replace the previous Talento model, which, from 2016 to 2020, had been based on the Renault Trafic.

== First generation (1994) ==
First generation
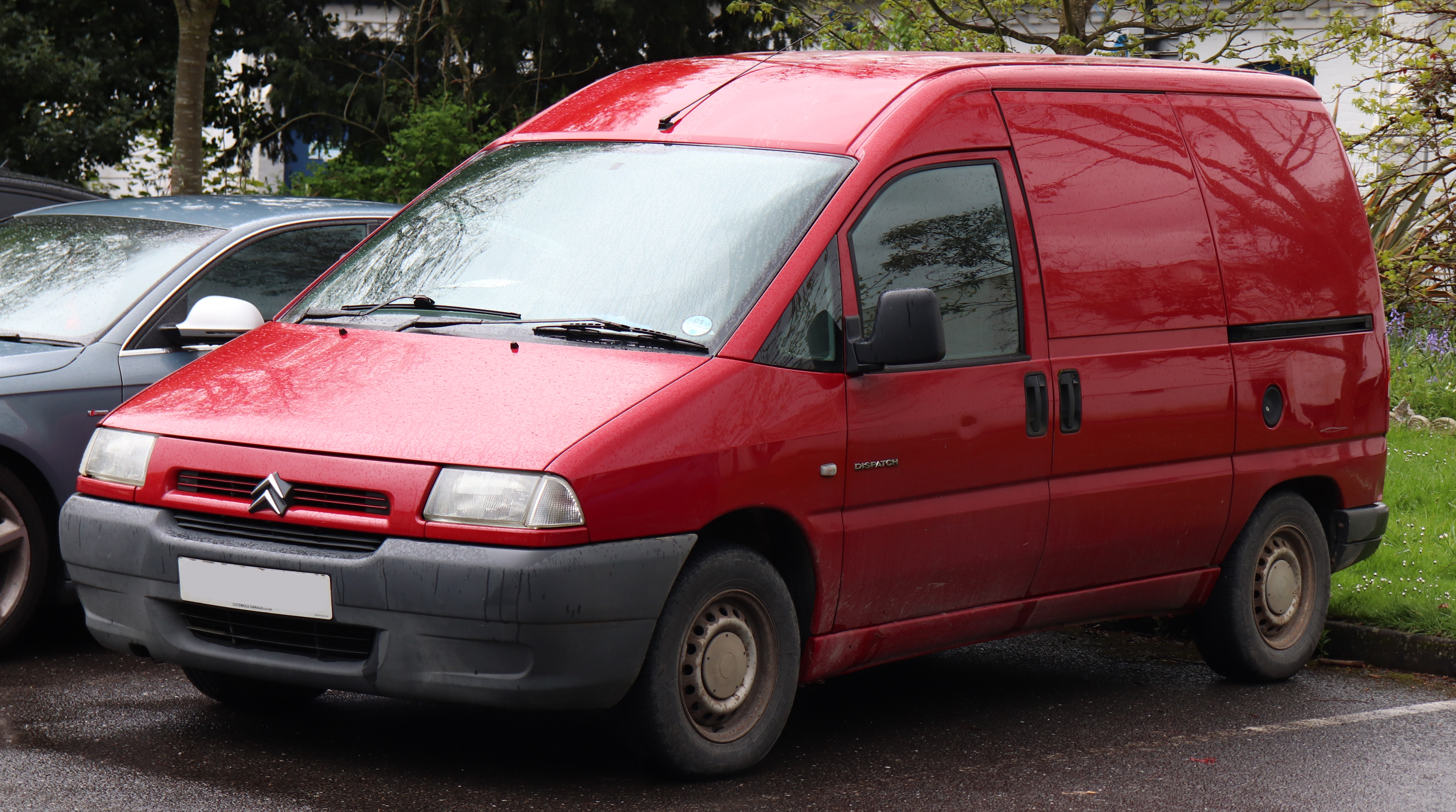
- (1994–2004) Citroën Jumpy

Overview
- Also called: Citroën Dispatch (UK and Ireland); Fiat Scudo; Peugeot Expert
- Production: June 1994 – January 2007 (Citroën); July 1995 – January 2007 (Peugeot); February 1996 – January 2007 (Fiat)
- Assembly: France: Lieu-Saint-Amand (Sevel Nord)

Body and chassis
- Related: Eurovans

Powertrain
- Engine: Petrol: 1.6 L Fiat 220.A2.000 I4; 2.0 L EW10 DOHC 16v I4; Diesel: 1.9 L DW8 I4; 1.9 L XUD9 I4; 1.9 L XUD9TE turbo I4; 2.0 L DW10 JTD I4

Dimensions
- Kerb weight: 1,380–1,450 kg (3,042–3,197 lb)

Citroën released the first-generation Jumpy in June 1994, naming the model "Dispatch" in English-speaking markets. Peugeot and Fiat followed with their rebadged models in July 1995 and February 1996 respectively. The vans differ little technically and visually, an example of badge engineering.

They share mechanicals and body structure with the Sevel Nord Eurovans minivans: the Citroën Evasion (Synergie), Fiat Ulysse, Lancia Zeta, and Peugeot 806. The engines available throughout the models do differ, with the Fiat getting its own engines distinct from those fitted to the Citroën and Peugeot. The Fiat Scudo replaced the first generation of the Fiat Talento.

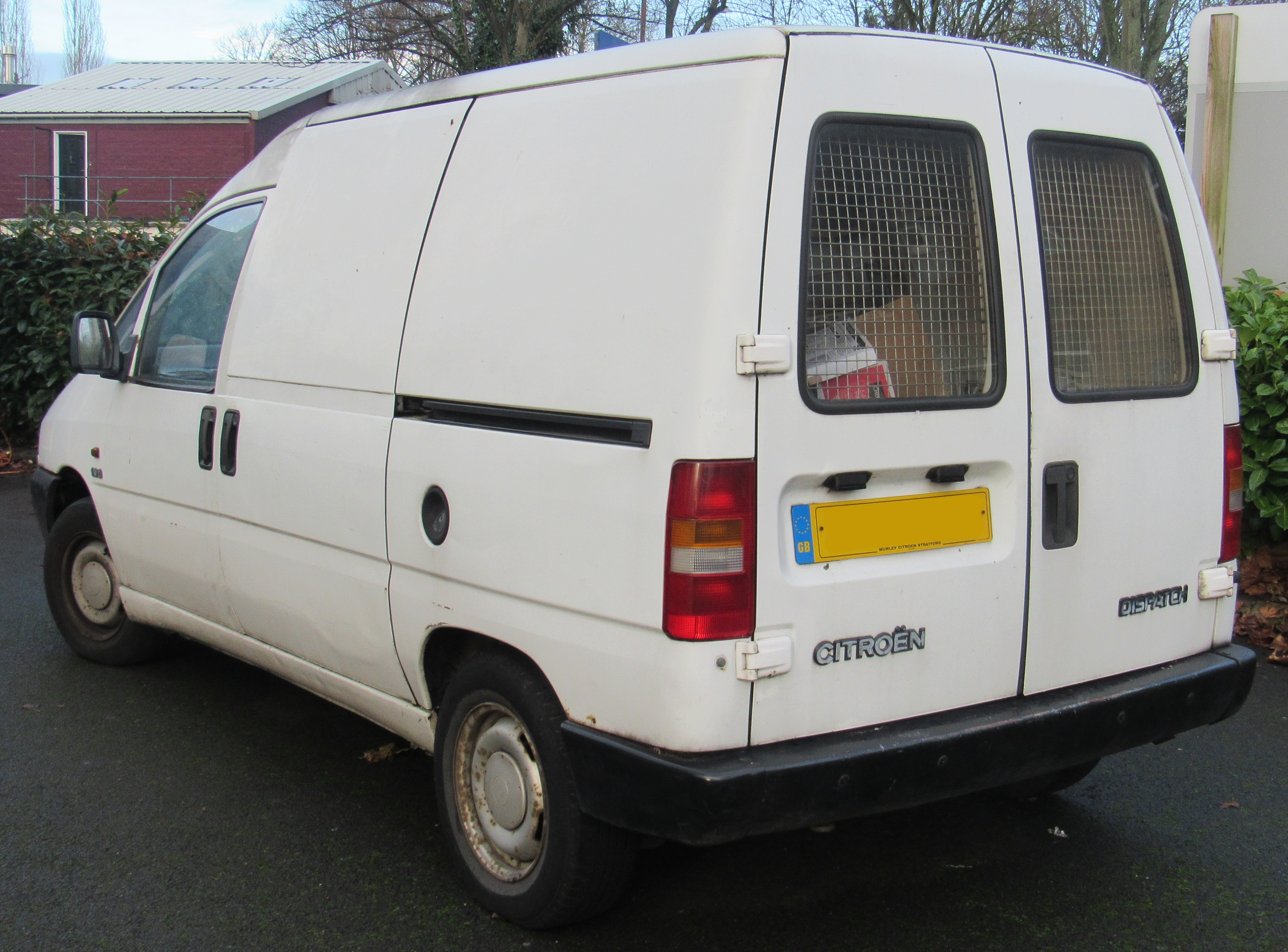
1995–2004 Citroën Dispatch
(Great Britain)

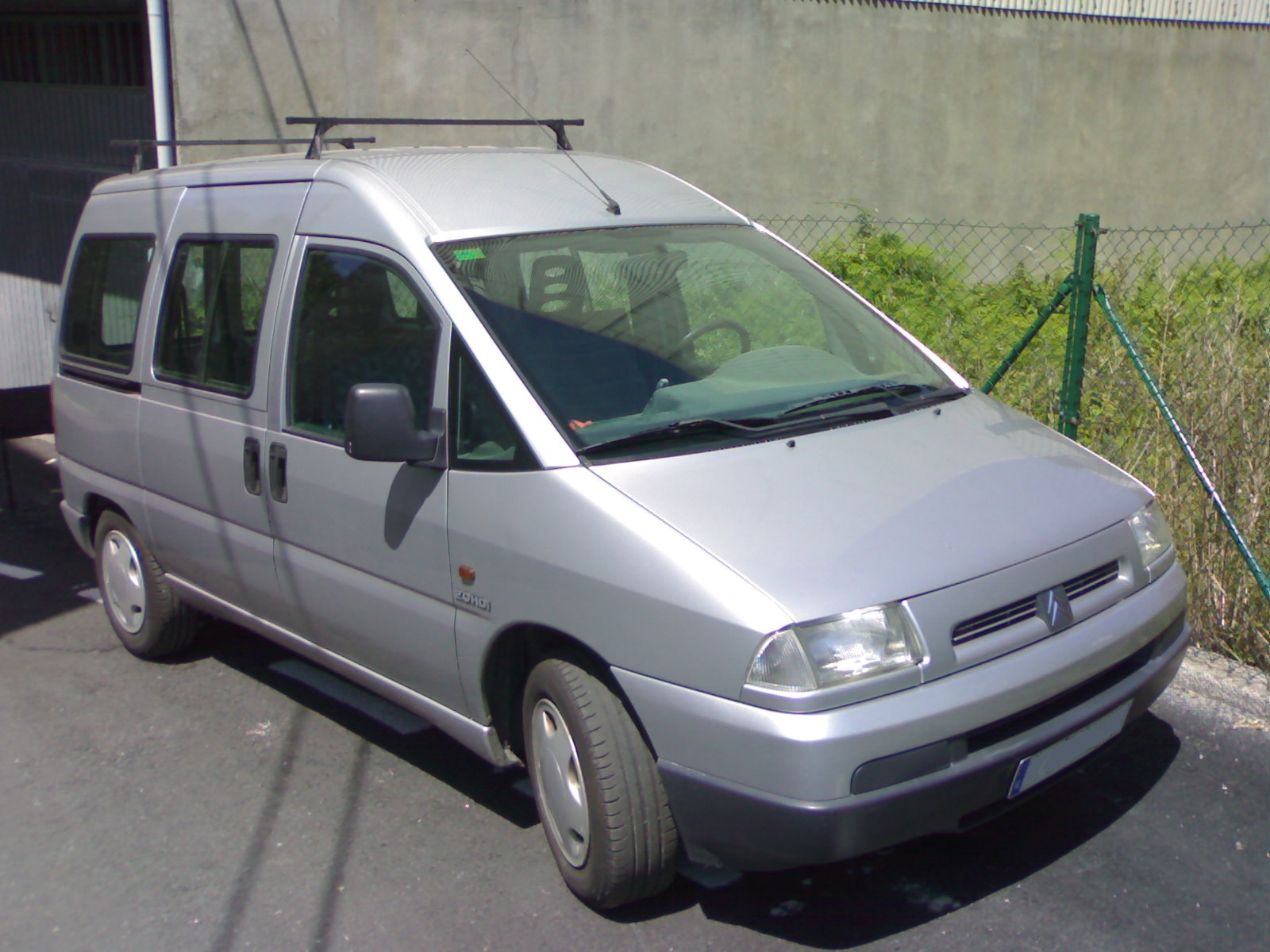
1995–2004 Citroën Jumpy

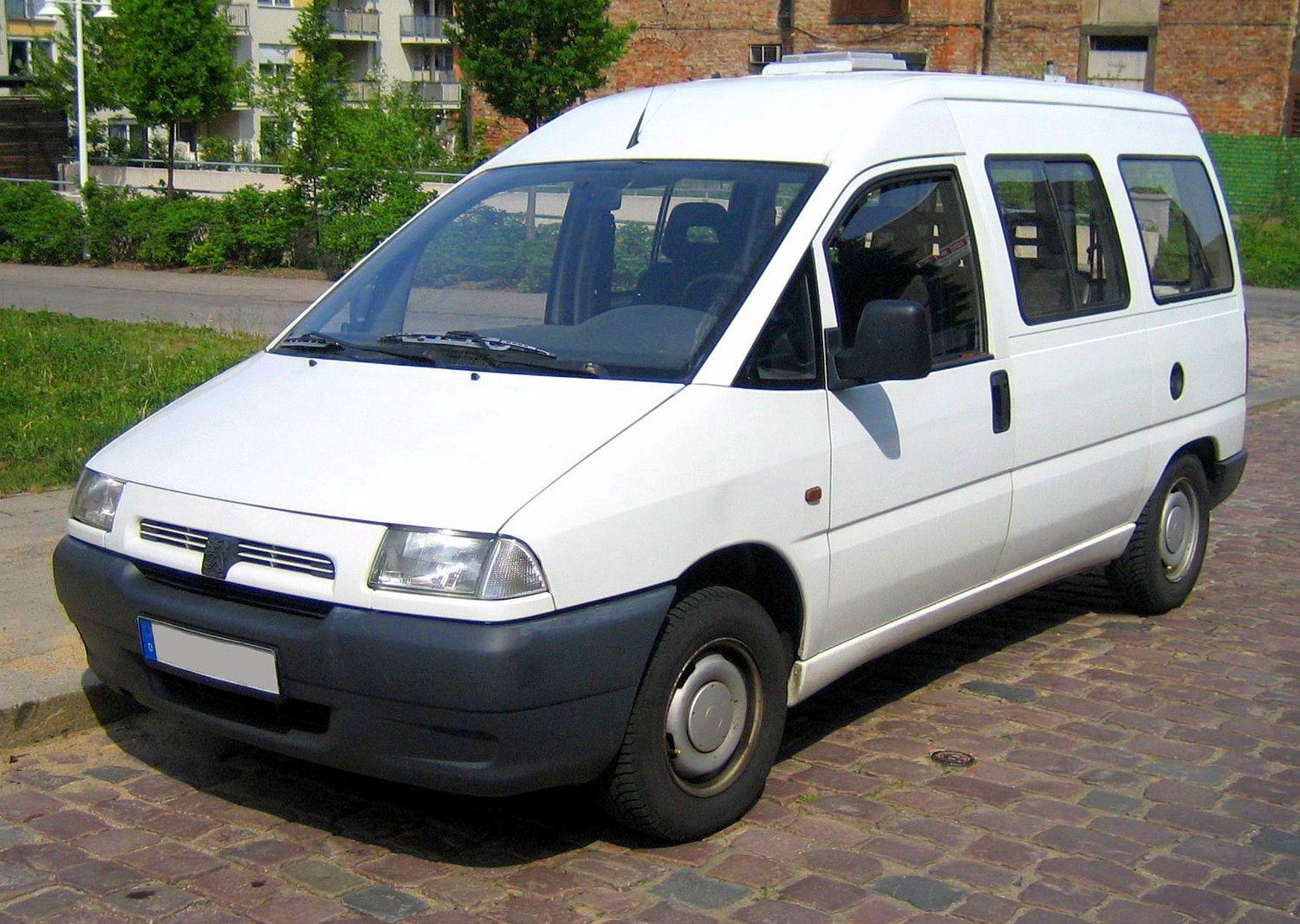
1995–2004 Peugeot Expert

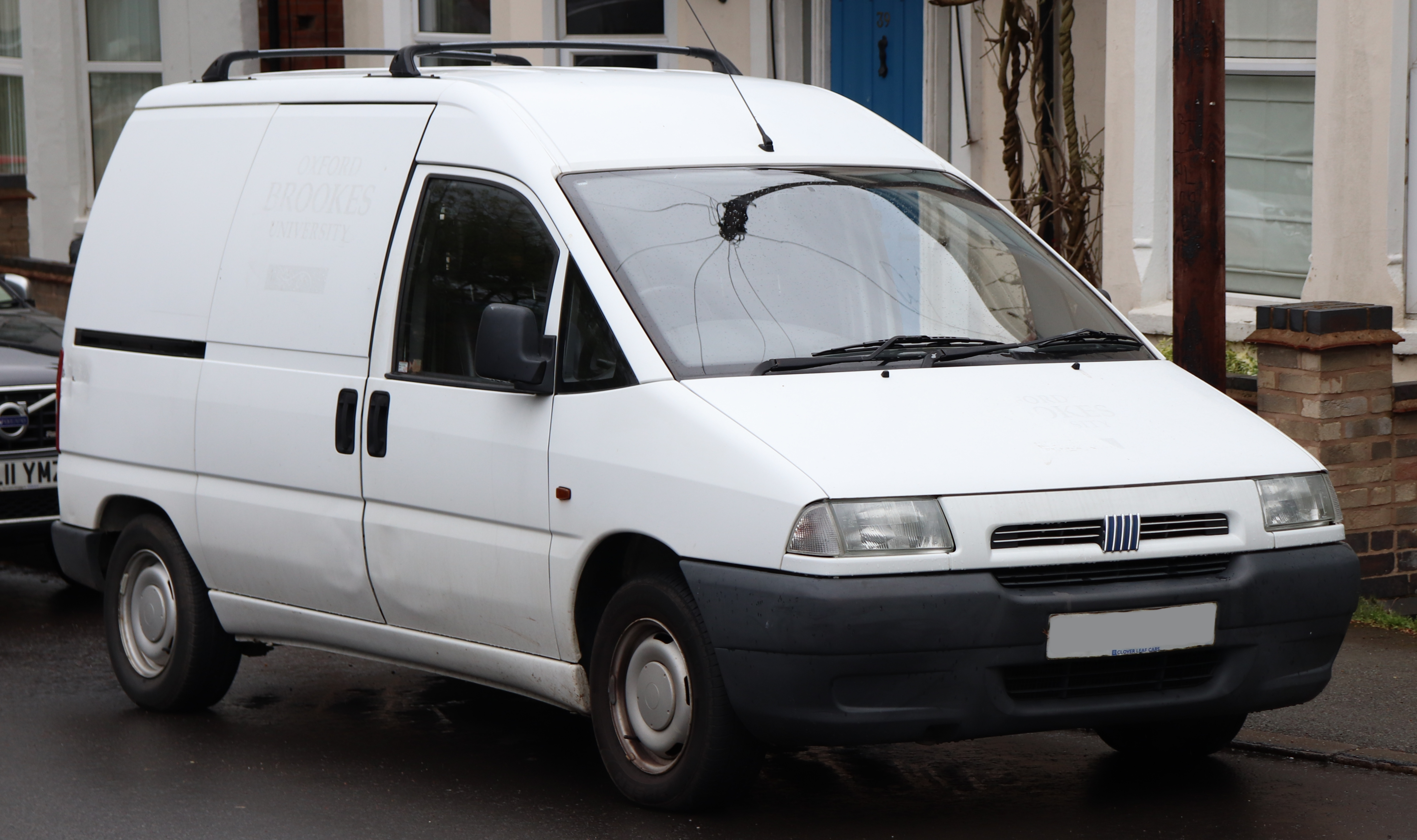
1996–2004 Fiat Scudo

=== Facelift ===
The model received a facelift in 2004, which changed most of the front end including the bumper and bonnet; for the first time, the headlamps were combined with the indicators rather than being a separate set of lights.

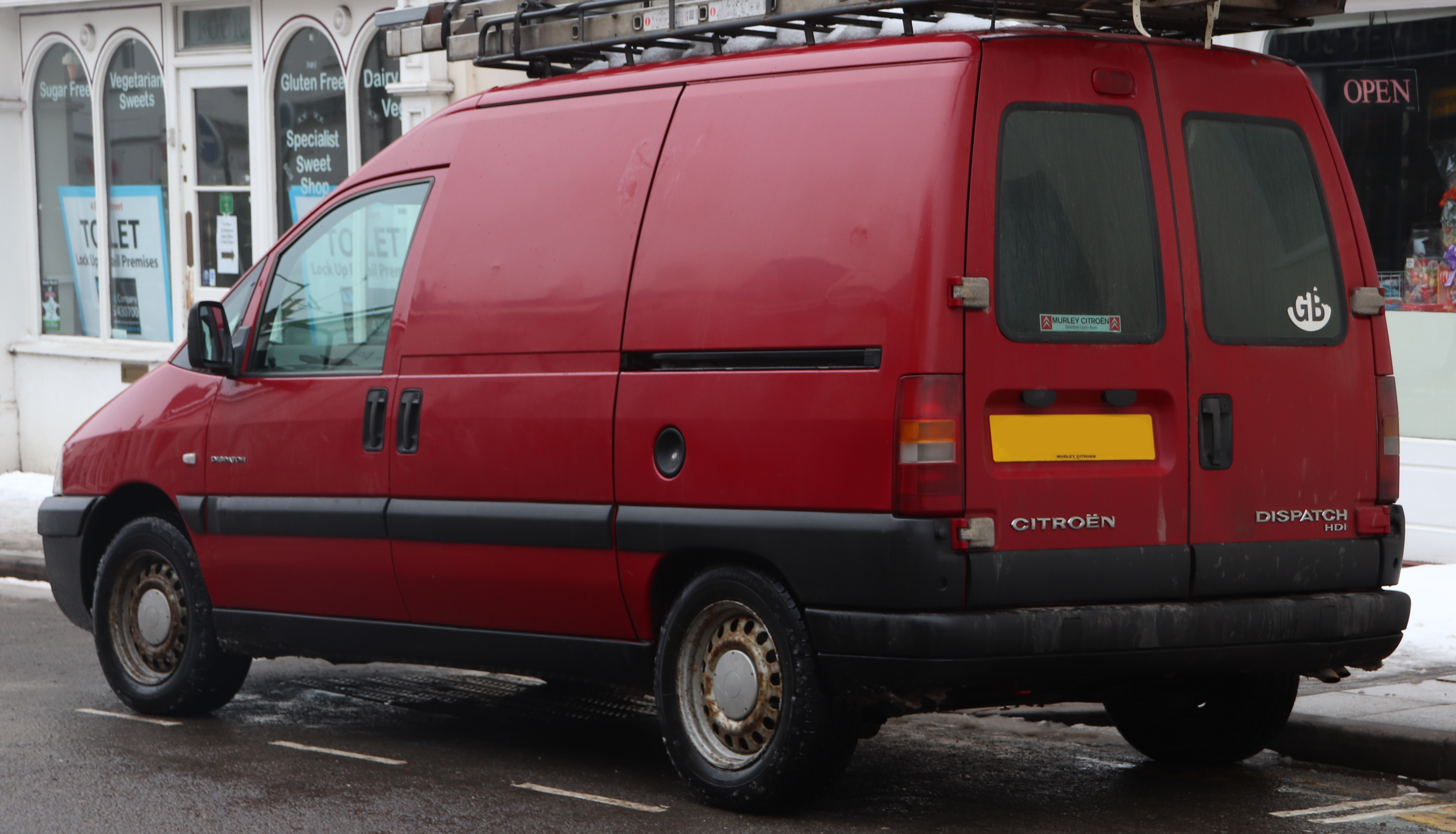
Facelift Citroën Dispatch
2004–2006 (Great Britain)

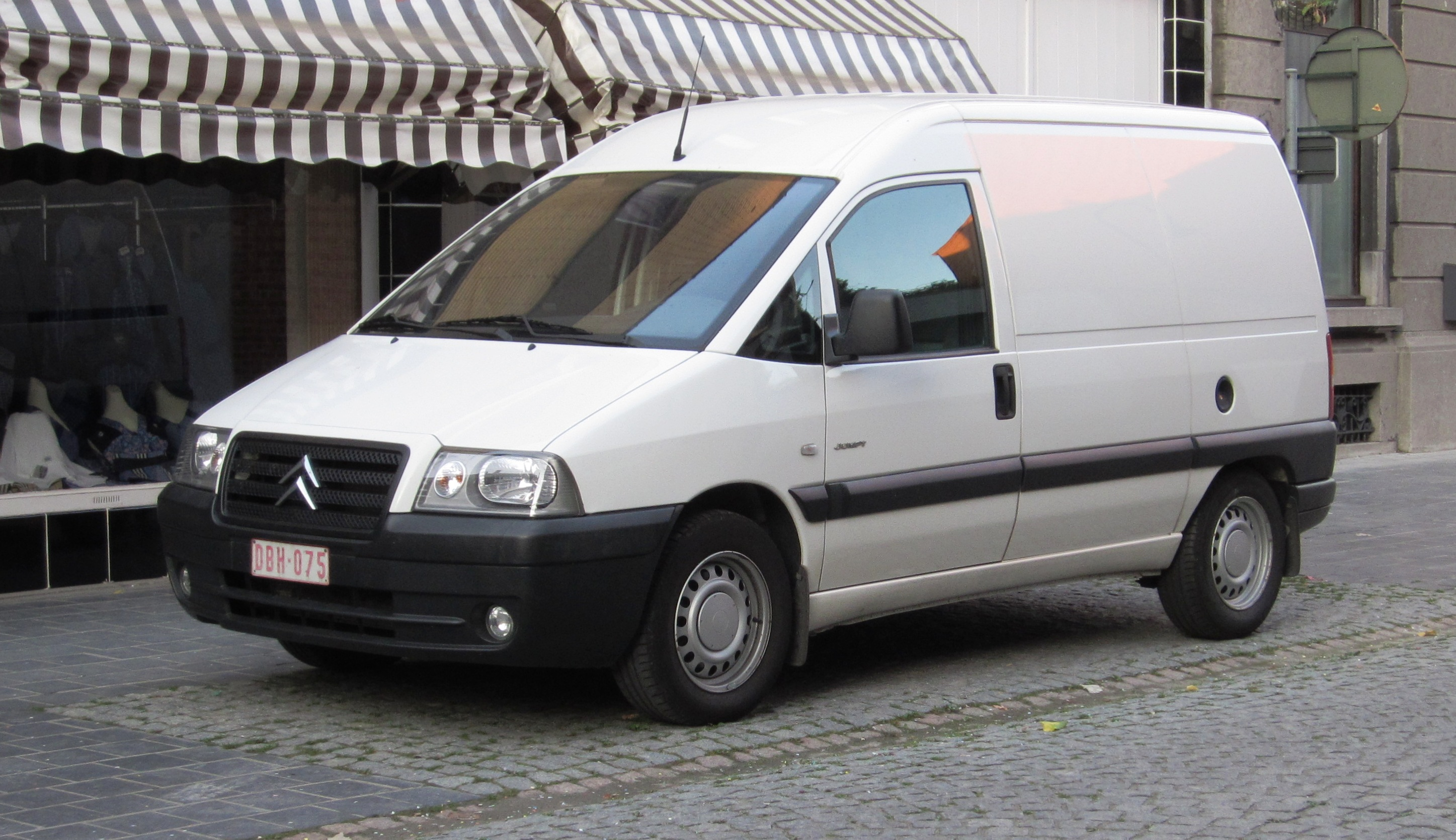
2004–2006 Citroën Jumpy

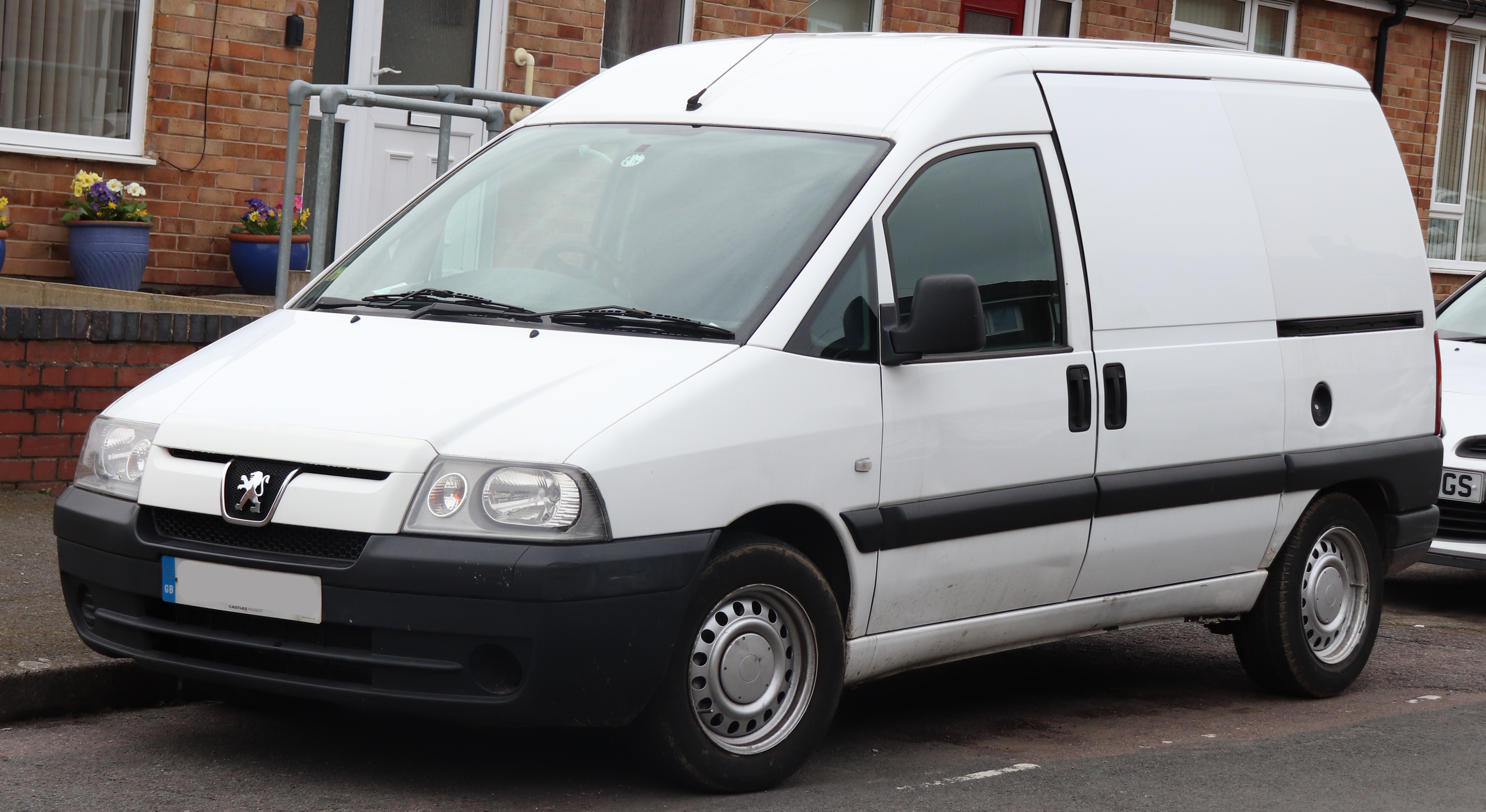
2004–2006 Peugeot Expert

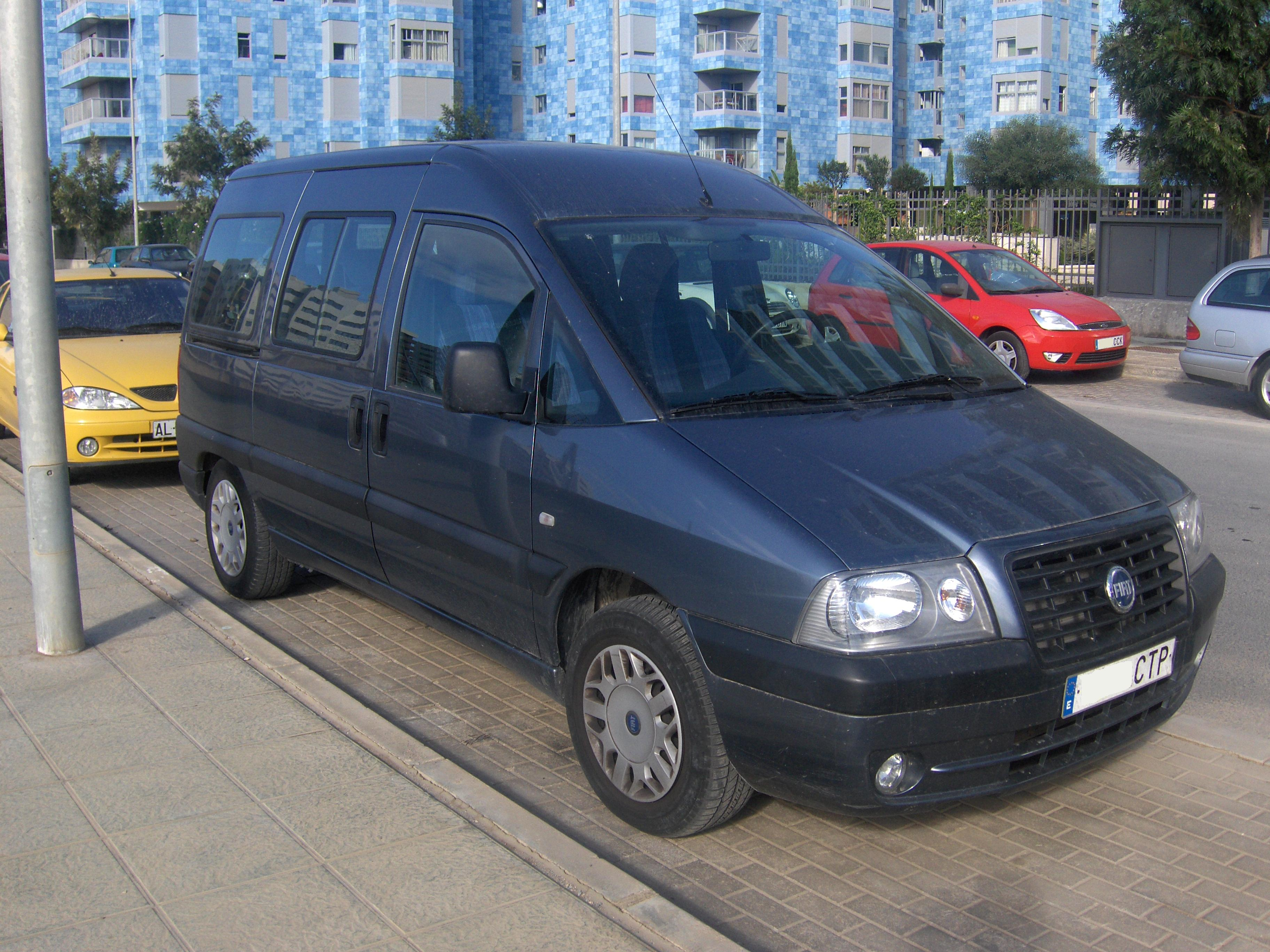
2004–2006 Fiat Scudo

=== Engines ===
Fiat Scudo engines
Model	Engine	Displacement	Valvetrain	Fuel system	Max. power at rpm	Max. torque at rpm	Years
Petrol engines
1.6 i.e.	Fiat 220.A2.000	1,581 cc	SOHC 8v	Single-point fuel injection	79 PS (58 kW; 78 hp) @ 5,750 rpm	125 N⋅m (92 lb⋅ft) @ 2,750 rpm	1996–2000
2.0 i.e.	PSA EW10	1,997 cc	DOHC 16v	Multi-point fuel injection	136 PS (100 kW; 134 hp) @ 6,000 rpm	190 N⋅m (140 lb⋅ft) @ 4,100 rpm	2000–2006
Diesel engines
1.9 D	PSA XUD9	1,905 cc	SOHC 8v	Indirect injection	69 PS (51 kW; 68 hp) @ 4,600 rpm	120 N⋅m (89 lb⋅ft) @ 2,000 rpm	1996–1999
1.9 D	PSA DW8	1,868 cc	SOHC 8v	Indirect injection	69 PS (51 kW; 68 hp) @ 4,600 rpm	125 N⋅m (92 lb⋅ft) @ 2,500 rpm	1999–2006
1.9 TD	PSA XUD9TE	1,905 cc	SOHC 8v	Indirect injection	92 PS (68 kW; 91 hp)} @ 4,000 rpm	196 N⋅m (145 lb⋅ft) @ 2,250 rpm	1996–1999
2.0 JTD	PSA DW10	1,997 cc	SOHC 8v	Common rail direct injection	94 PS (69 kW; 93 hp) @ 4,000 rpm	215 N⋅m (159 lb⋅ft) @ 1,750 rpm	1999–2006
2.0 JTD	PSA DW10	1,997 cc	SOHC 8v	Common rail direct injection	109 PS (80 kW; 108 hp) @ 4,000 rpm	250 N⋅m (184 lb⋅ft) @ 1,750 rpm	1999–2006
2.0 JTD^{1}	PSA DW10	1,997 cc	DOHC 16v	Common rail direct injection	109 PS (80 kW; 108 hp) @ 4,000 rpm	270 N⋅m (199 lb⋅ft) @ 1,750 rpm	2000–2006

^{1} Only for Scudo Combinato

== Second generation (G9; 2007) ==
Second generation
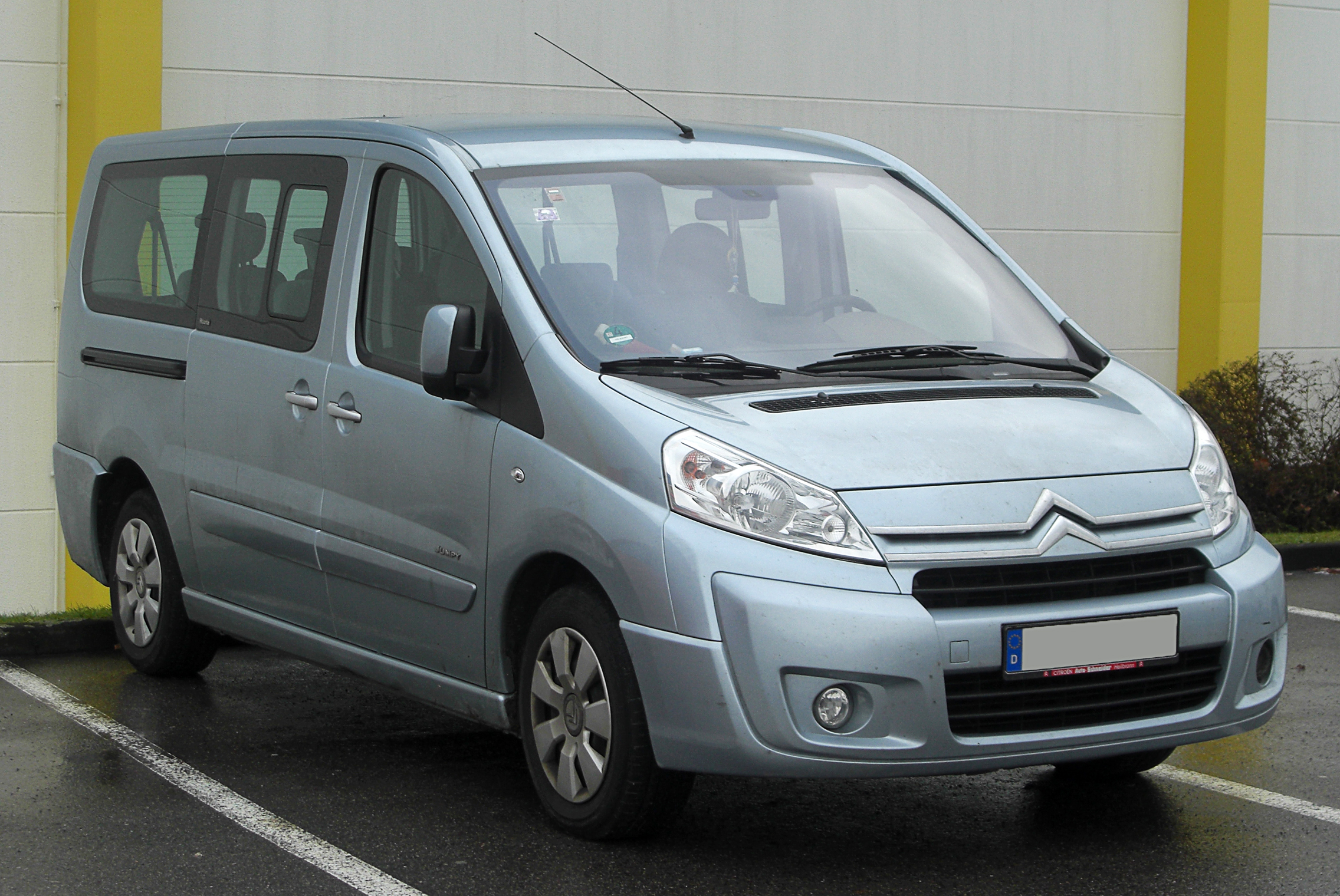
- Citroën Jumpy

Overview
- Also called: Citroën Dispatch (UK and Ireland); Fiat Scudo; Peugeot Expert; Toyota Proace (since 2013)
- Production: January 2007 – March 2016 (SWB); November 2006 – March 2016 (LWB); July 2013 – March 2016 (Toyota Proace)
- Assembly: France: Lieu-Saint-Amand (Sevel Nord)

Body and chassis
- Body style: 4/5-door panel van 4/5-door minibus

Powertrain
- Engine: Petrol: 2.0 L EW10 DOHC 16v I4; Diesel: 1.6 L DLD-416 I4; 2.0 L DW10 JTD I4
- Transmission: 5-speed Manual; 6-speed manual 6-Speed Aisin AWTF-80SC automatic

Dimensions
- Kerb weight: 1,910 kg (4,211 lb)-2,044 kg (4,506 lb)

The second generation offered increased cargo space and more body styles over the previous generation. It was launched in November 2006, with deliveries beginning in principal markets in January 2007. The Citroën is available in 90 bhp, 120 bhp (89 kW; 122 PS) and 136 bhp (101 kW; 138 PS) versions with the option of four diesel engines or one petrol engine.

The Peugeot Expert II was launched in January 2007, with the addition of a people carrier model, the Tepee. The PSA/Fiat joint venture ended in March 2016.

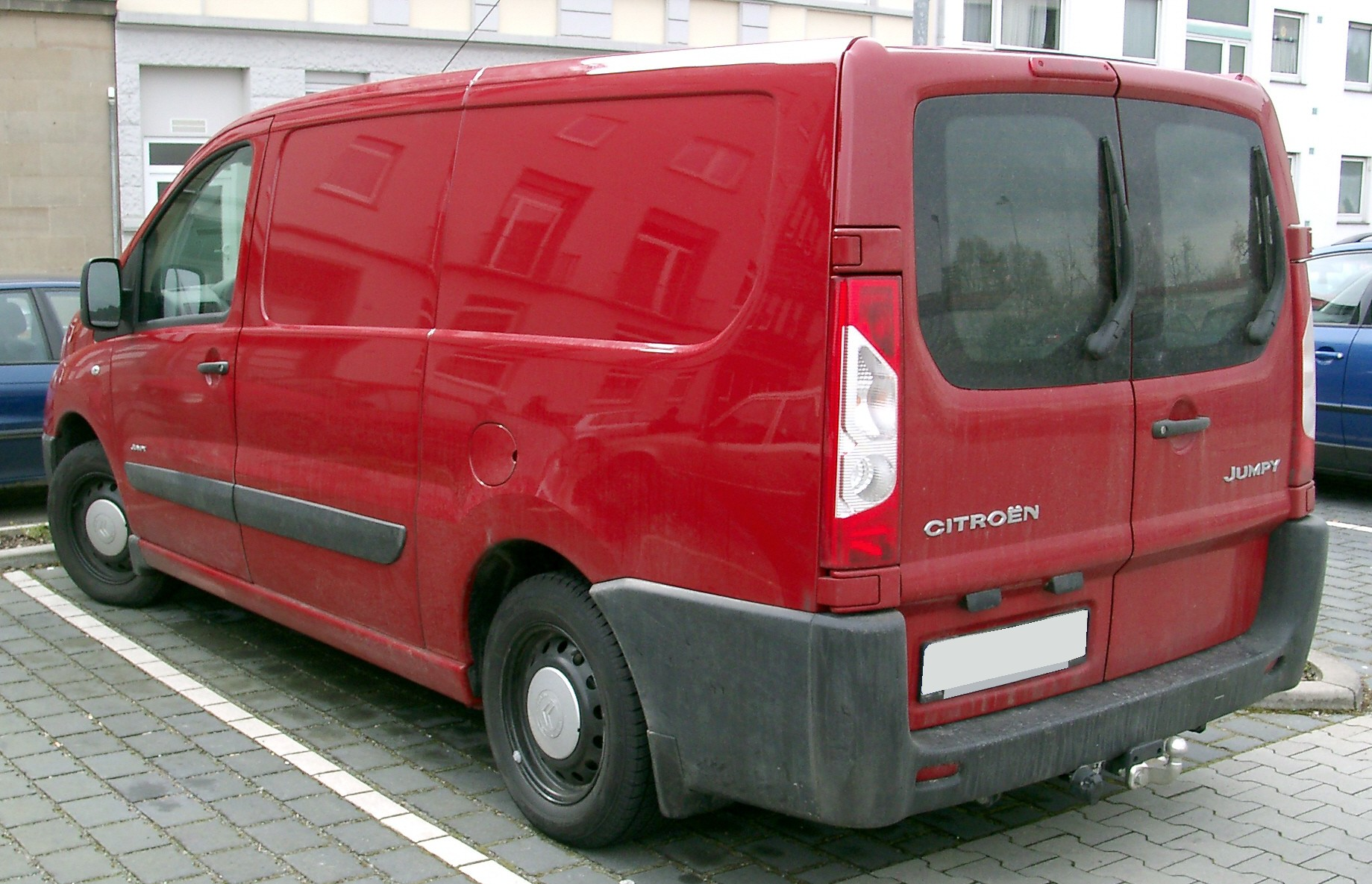
2007–2012 Citroën Jumpy

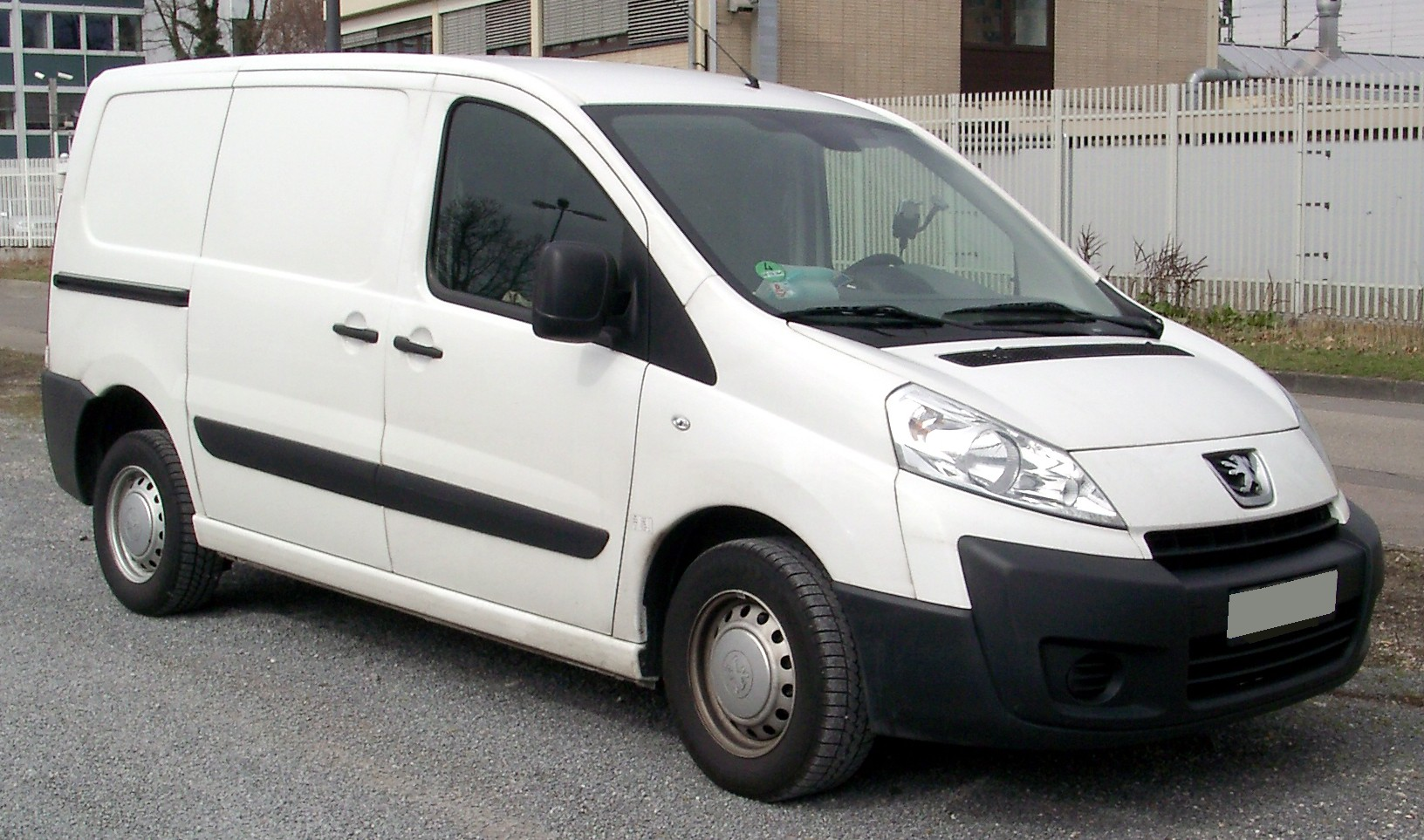
2007–2012 Peugeot Expert

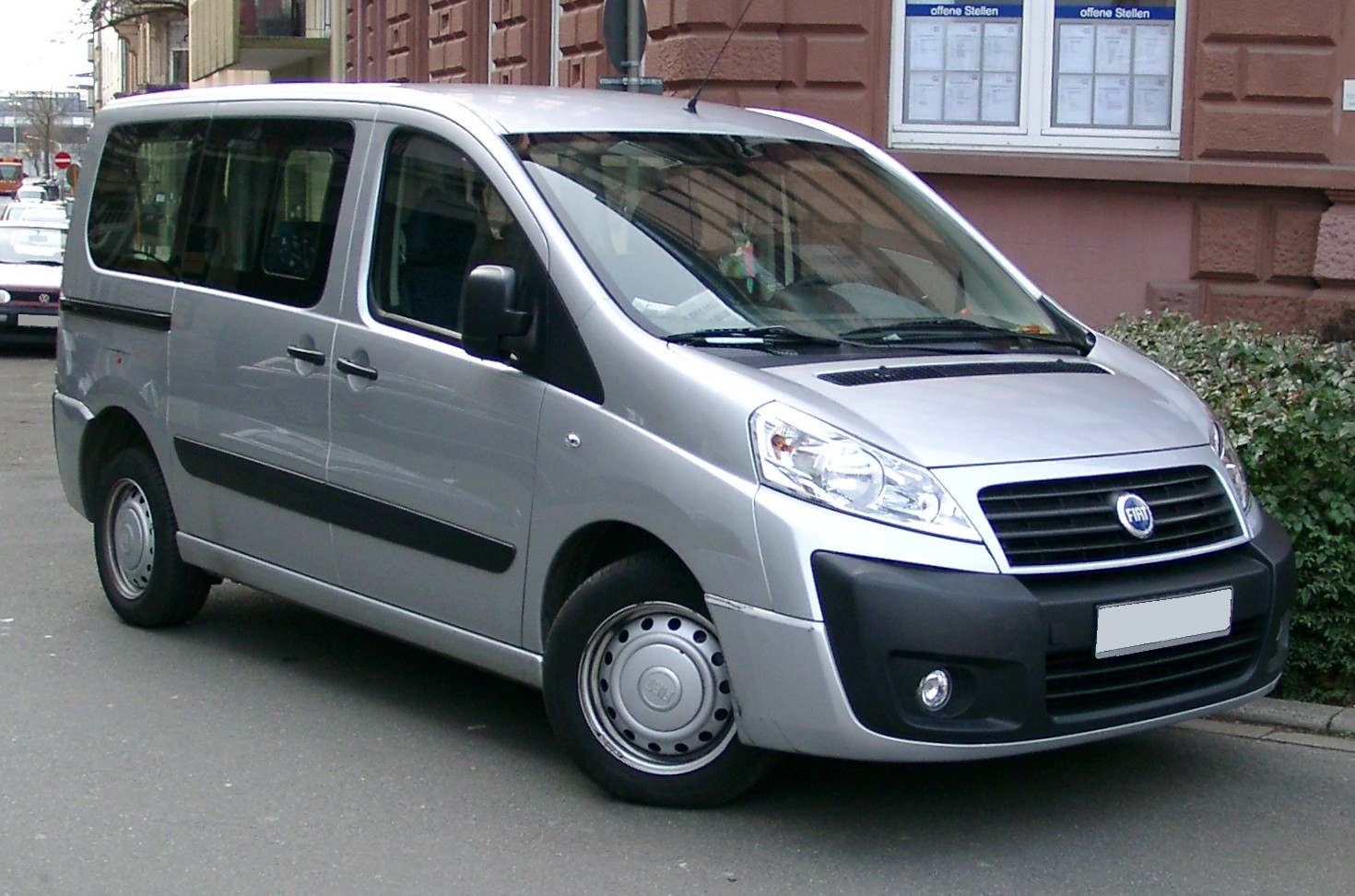
2007–2012 Fiat Scudo

=== Facelift ===
The model received a slight facelift in February 2012, which changed the grille and front bumper. From July 2013, Toyota began sales of a rebadged version called Toyota Proace.

The Fiat Scudo was discontinued in Summer 2012.

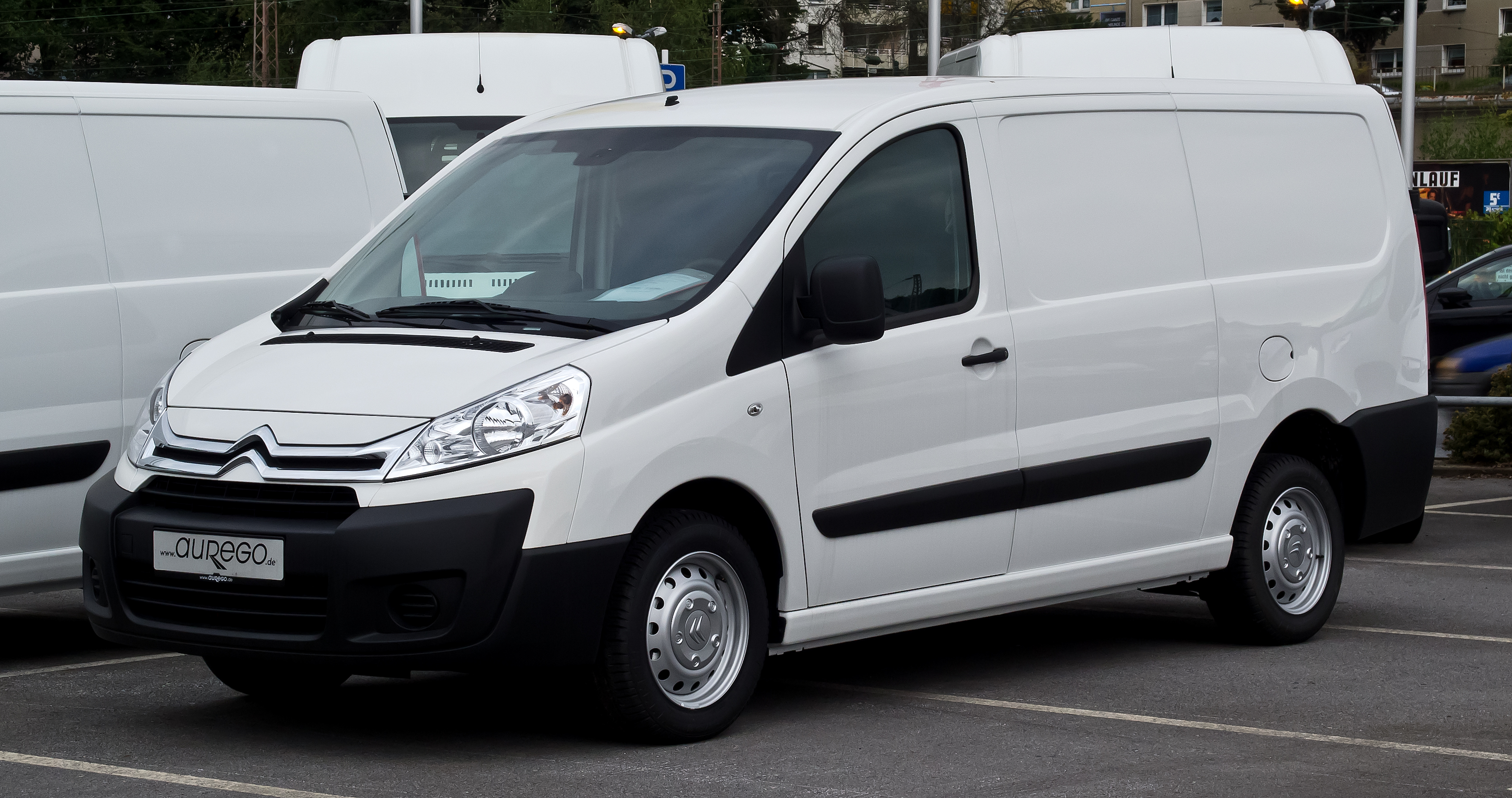
2012–2016 Citroën Jumpy

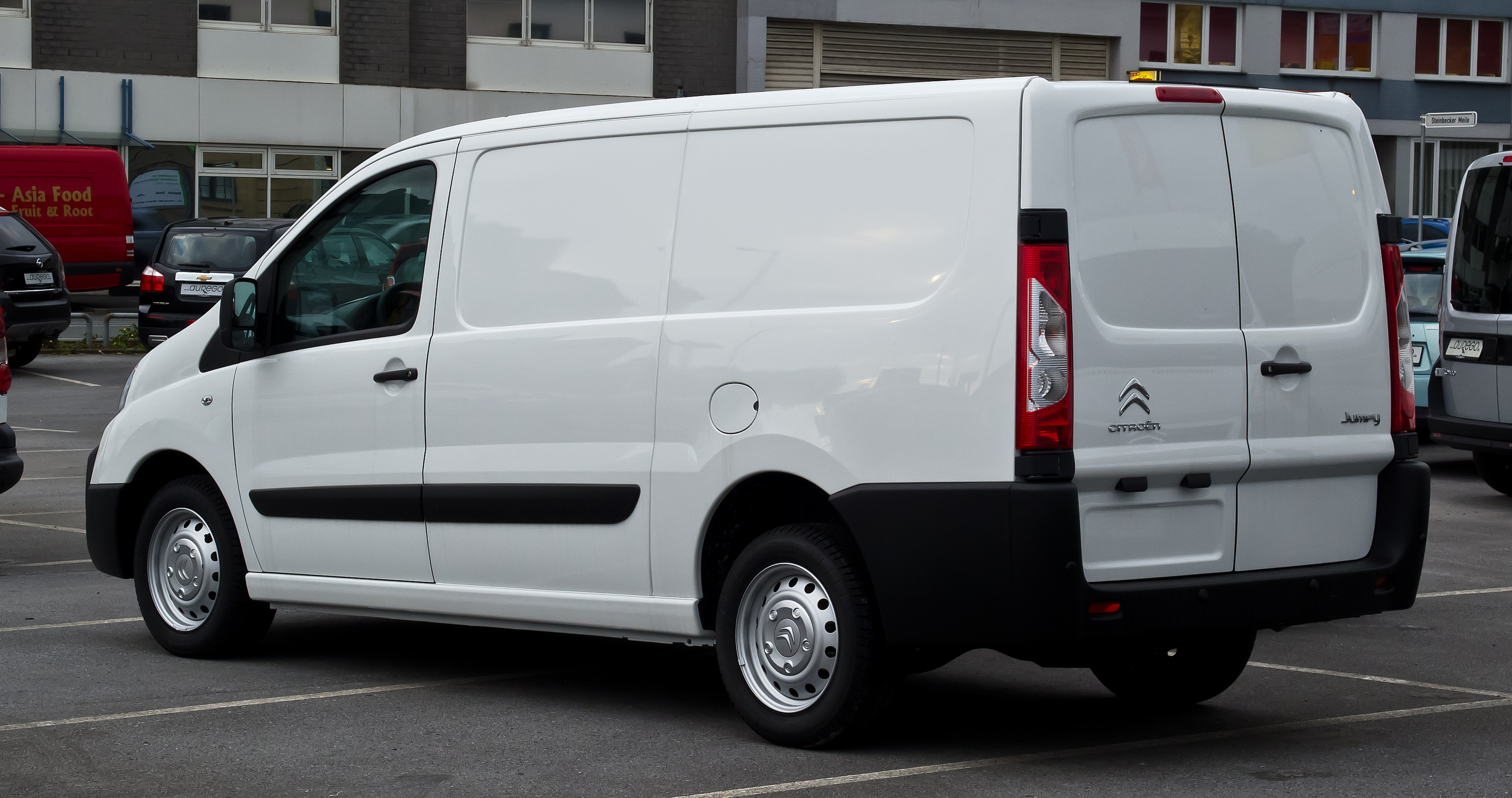
2012–2016 Citroën Jumpy

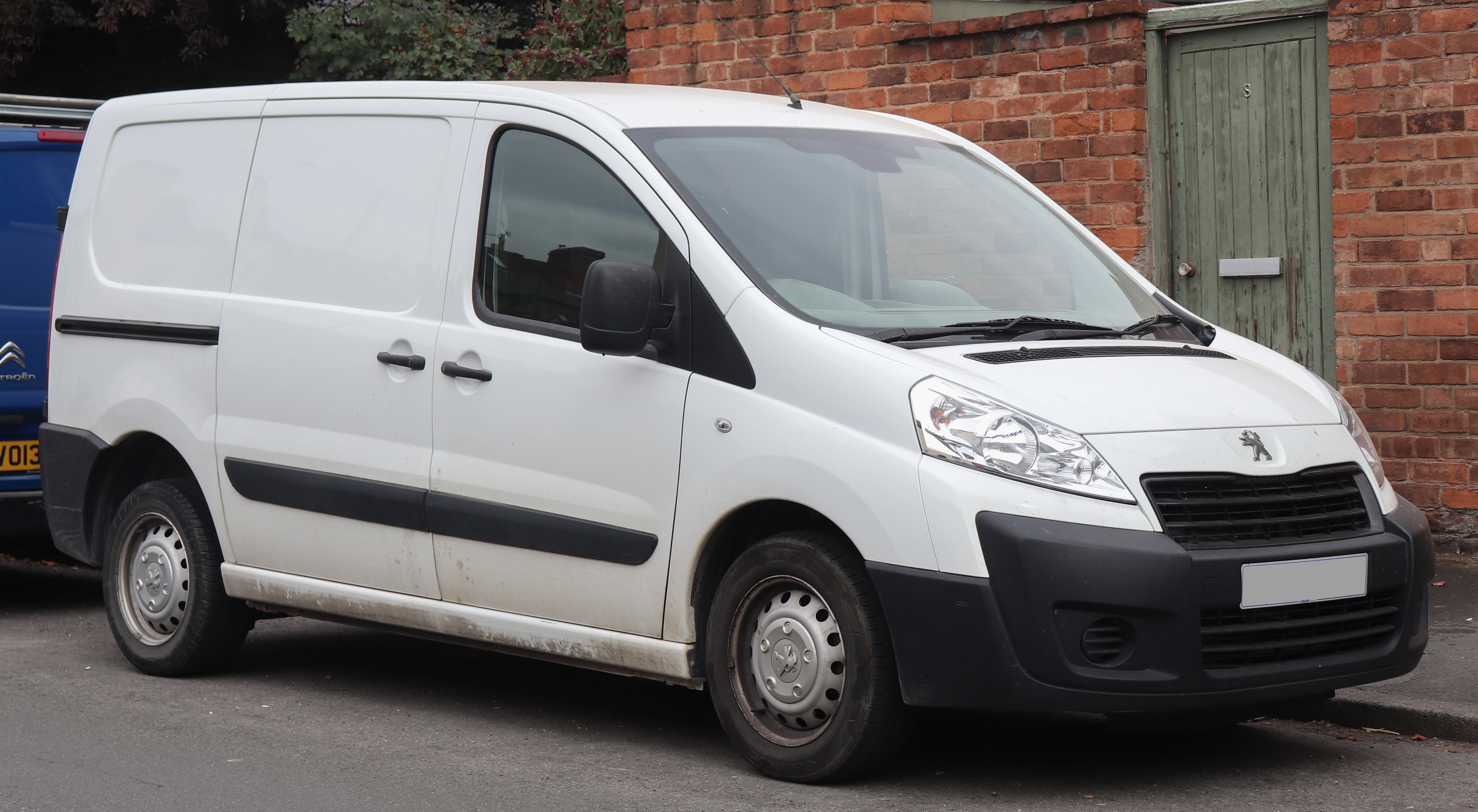
2012–2016 Peugeot Expert

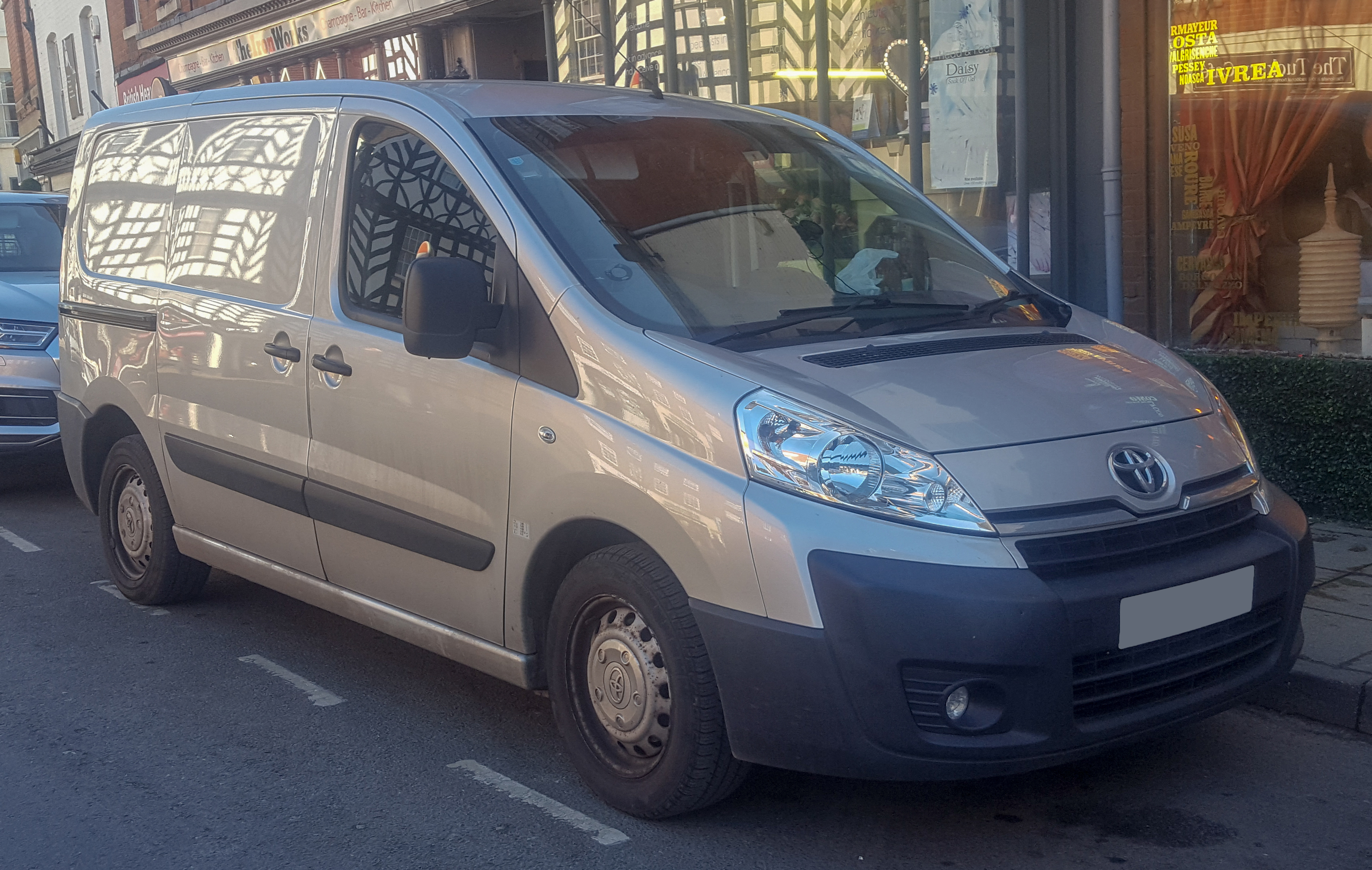
2013–2016 Toyota Proace

=== Engines ===
Engines
Model	Engine	Displacement	Valvetrain	Fuel system	Max. power at rpm	Max. torque at rpm	Gearbox	Years
Petrol engines
2.0 i.e.	PSA EW10	1,997 cc	DOHC 16v	Multi-point fuel injection	140 PS (103 kW; 138 hp) @ 6,000 rpm	180 N⋅m (133 lb⋅ft) @ 2,500 rpm	5-speed manual	2007–2016
Diesel engines
90 Multijet	Ford DLD-416	1,560 cc	DOHC 16v	Common rail direct injection	90 PS (66 kW; 89 hp) @ 4,000 rpm	180 N⋅m (133 lb⋅ft) @ 1,750 rpm	5-speed manual	2007–2016
120 Multijet	PSA DW10	1,997 cc	DOHC 16v	Common rail direct injection	120 PS (88 kW; 118 hp) @ 4,000 rpm	300 N⋅m (221 lb⋅ft) @ 2,000 rpm	6-speed manual	2007–2016
130 Multijet	PSA DW10	1,997 cc	DOHC 16v	Common rail direct injection	130 PS (96 kW; 128 hp) @ 4,000 rpm	320 N⋅m (236 lb⋅ft) @ 2,000 rpm	6-speed manual	2007–2016
140 Multijet	PSA DW10	1,997 cc	DOHC 16v	Common rail direct injection	136 PS (100 kW; 134 hp) @ 4,000 rpm	320 N⋅m (236 lb⋅ft) @ 2,000 rpm	6-speed manual	2007–2016
165 Multijet	PSA DW10	1,997 cc	DOHC 16v	Common rail direct injection	163 PS (120 kW; 161 hp) @ 3,750 rpm	340 N⋅m (251 lb⋅ft) @ 2,000 rpm	6-speed manual 6-speed automatic	2010–2016 2010–2016

== Third generation (K0; 2016) ==
Third generation (2016)
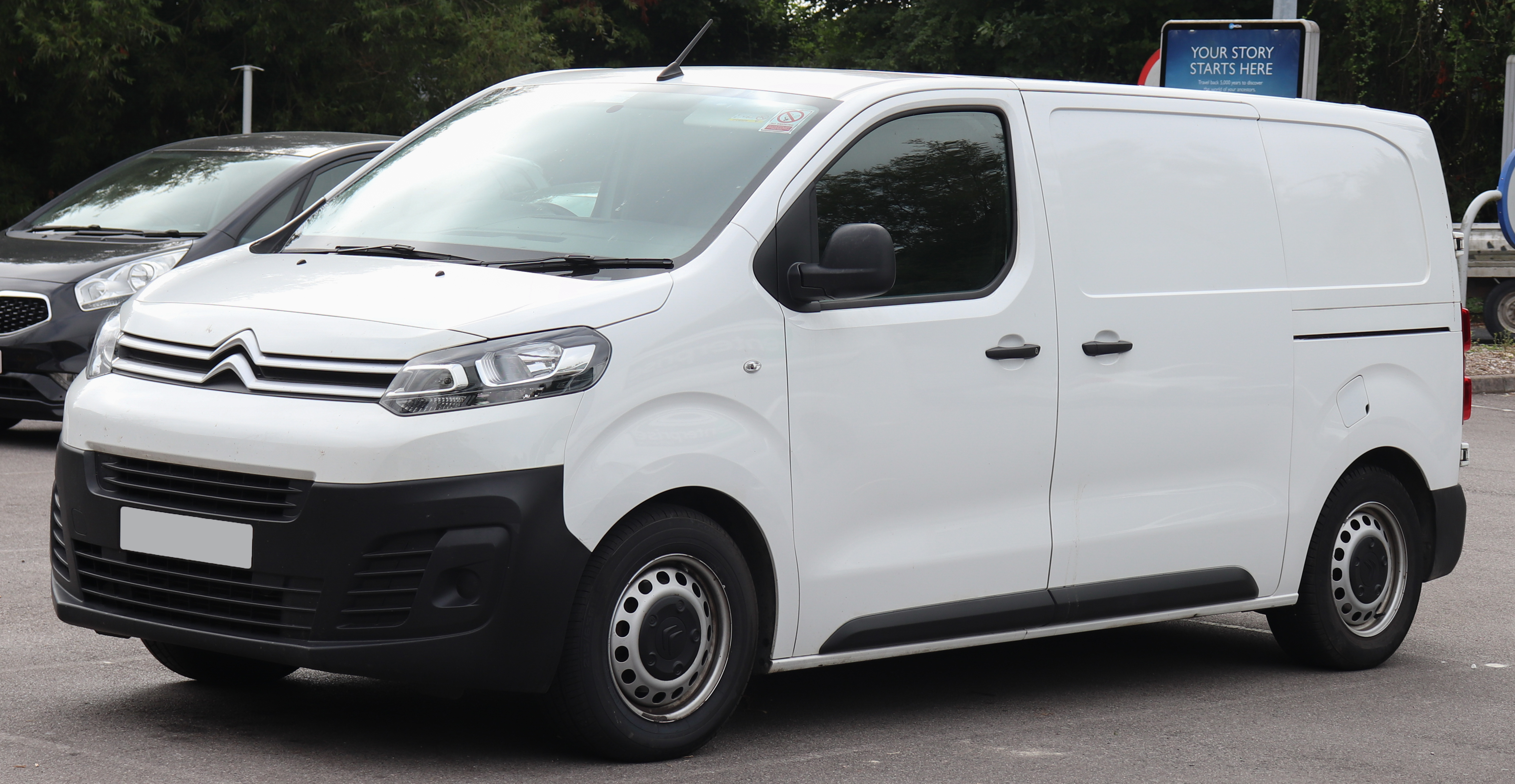
- 2016 Citroën Dispatch (UK)

Overview
- Also called: Citroën Dispatch (UK and Ireland); Citroën Holidays (camper, 2024–present); Citroën SpaceTourer (passenger); Fiat Scudo (2022–present); Fiat Ulysse (passenger, 2022–present); Iveco eJolly; Opel Vivaro (2019–present); Opel Zafira Life (passenger, 2019–present); Peugeot Expert; Peugeot Traveller (passenger); Peugeot Expert Traveller (passenger); Ram ProMaster City (North America, 2027-present); Toyota Proace; Toyota Proace Verso (passenger); Vauxhall Vivaro (UK, 2019–present)
- Production: December 2015 – present (Citroën SpaceTourer/Peugeot Traveller); March 2016 – present (Citroën Jumpy/Peugeot Expert/Toyota Proace); October 2019 – present (Opel/Vauxhall); 2022–present (Fiat); 2025–present (Iveco); 2027 (to commence) (Ram)
- Assembly: France: Lieu-Saint-Amand (Sevel Nord); Russia: Kaluga (PSA Kaluga, 2022); Turkey: Bursa (Tofaş); United Kingdom: Luton, England (Vauxhall Luton, until 2025); United Kingdom: Ellesmere Port, England (Vauxhall Ellesmere Port, since 2026); Uruguay: Montevideo (Nordex S.A.); Germany: Rüsselsheim (Opel Rüsselsheim, hydrogen conversion)

Body and chassis
- Body style: 4/5-door panel van 4/5-door minibus
- Platform: PSA EMP2

Powertrain
- Engine: Diesel: 1.6 L Ford DLD-416 I4; 2.0 L PSA DW10 I4; 2.2 L Pratola Serra I4
- Electric motor: permanent-magnet synchronous motor (electric versions)
- Transmission: 5-speed manual 6-speed manual 6-speed Aisin AWTF-80SC automatic
- Electric range: 350 km WLTP (eK0)

Dimensions
- Wheelbase: SWB: 2,925 mm (115.2 in); LWB: 3,275 mm (128.9 in)
- Length: Compact: 4,609 mm (181.5 in); Standard: 4,959 mm (195.2 in); Long: 5,309 mm (209.0 in)
- Width: 1,920 mm (75.6 in)
- Height: 1,890–1,950 mm (74.4–76.8 in)

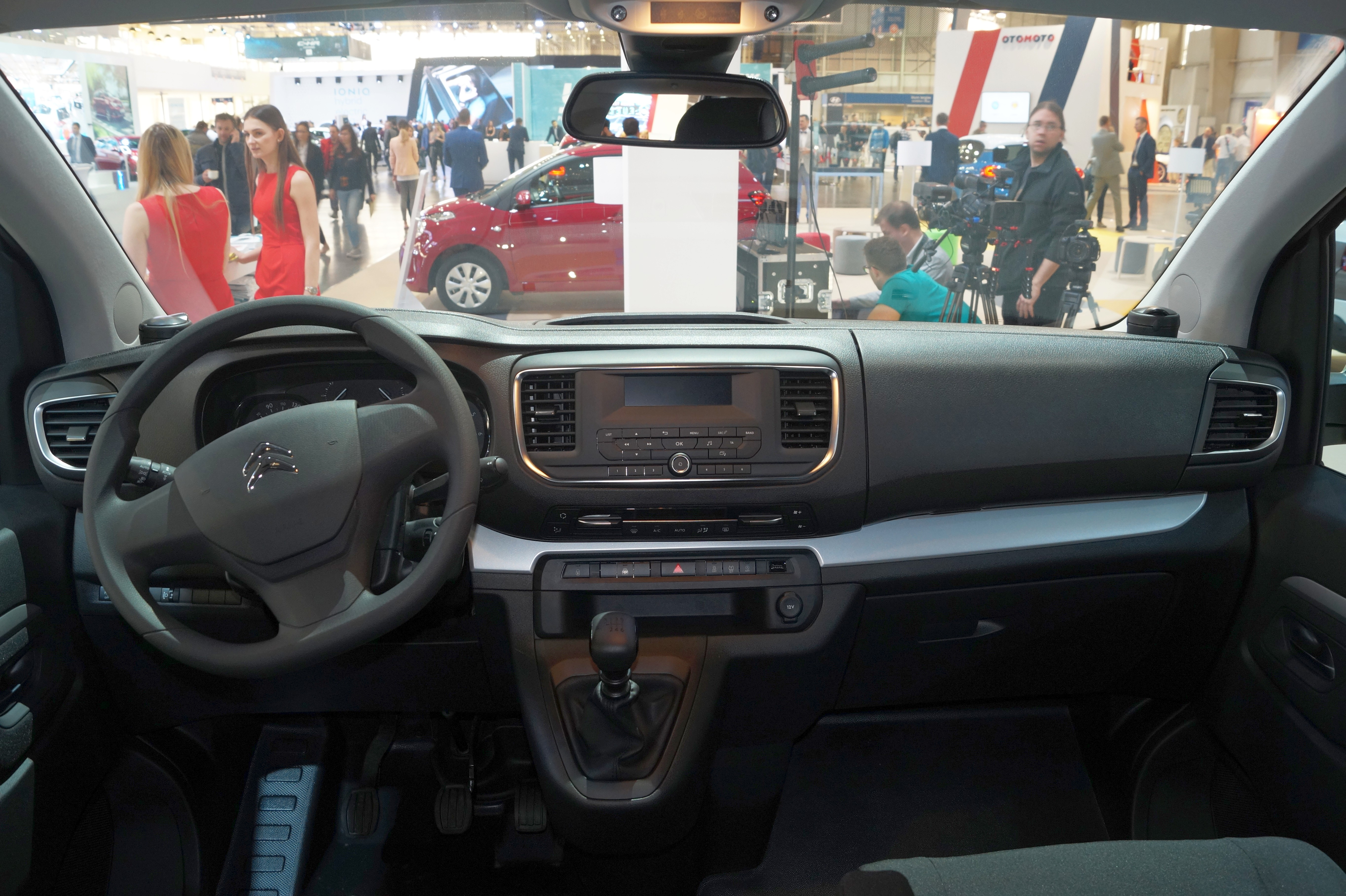
Interior (Citroën SpaceTourer)

At the 2016 Geneva Motor Show, Citroën, Peugeot and Toyota revealed their latest generation of their respective vans. With this new generation the vans became more contemporary, and the Citroën and Peugeot models gained new names for the passenger versions: Citroën SpaceTourer and Peugeot Traveller. Toyota partially retained the Proace name, calling their version Proace Verso.

Commercial variants have been released in March 2016, under the Citroën Jumpy, Peugeot Expert and Toyota Proace names. In 2019, Opel/Vauxhall switched to the PSA van platform for the Vivaro.

The Fiat Scudo and Ulysse nameplates were revived in 2021 using the PSA van platform, replacing the Renault Trafic-based Talento.

In January 2022, Stellantis stopped marketing the internal combustion versions of its passenger vans in Europe (Switzerland and Balkan countries excepted). This decision is mainly motivated by a decision to reduce the average CO_{2} emissions of vehicles marketed by the company in Europe in accordance with the CAFE (Corporate Average Fuel Economy) regulations set up by the European Union. As a result, the SpaceTourer, Traveller and Zafira Life are now only offered in their 100% electric and hydrogen versions. Panel van models are not affected by this change, nor are Toyota-badged models, as the Japanese manufacturer is in line with the objectives of the CAFE regulations.

=== Production ===
Since 2017, both Citroën Jumpy and Peugeot Expert are assembled as CKD in Montevideo, Uruguay. As of October 2019, Nordex S.A. has produced 13,000 units, with most of them being exported to Brazil and Argentina.

In April 2018, PSA started the production of the Peugeot Expert and Citroën Jumpy in its Russian plant, in Kaluga. The next month began the production of the Traveller and SpaceTourer in the same factory. In December 2019, the Opel Zafira Life joined them on Kaluga assembly lines, followed by the Vivaro a few months later.

In September 2018, PSA announced that the Luton plant would begin production of the third generation Citroën Jumpy/Dispatch/SpaceTourer Peugeot Expert/Traveller, but also the second generation of the Toyota ProAce and ProAce Verso from the end of 2019, which would also be badged as the Opel/Vauxhall Zafira Life/Vivaro Life/Vivaro to replace the Trafic-based Vivaro.
This continued until the closure of the Luton plant in 2025.

In February 2022, Stellantis began exporting part of the production of the Russian plant in Kaluga to Western Europe, where Citroën, Peugeot, and Opel models are manufactured. In March 2022, Stellantis halted exports from Russia following Moscow's invasion of Ukraine, putting an end to the short-lived export program from Kaluga.

=== Special trims ===
==== GS ====
In October 2022, the Vauxhall Vivaro received a sporty GS trim option alongside a more powerful diesel engine.

=== Electric versions ===
Electric "eK0" versions are badged and sold by multiple Stellantis brands and Toyota; they all share a common traction motor with the smaller Citroën e-Berlingo and its rebadged siblings, which has an output of 100 kW (134 hp) with 260 N⋅m (192 lb⋅ft) of torque; the motor is also used for battery-electric Stellantis passenger cars such as the Peugeot e-208. While the e-Berlingo is fitted with a 50 kWh battery, the e-Jumpy (and its rebadged cousins) also offer a larger 75 kWh battery as an option. Quoted maximum driving range changes from 144 mi (232 km) under the WLTP cycle with the smaller battery to 205 mi (330 km) (WLTP) with the larger 75 kW-hr battery. The vans are fitted with a 7.4 kW (AC) charger as standard, and an 11 kW (AC) charger is available as an option.

Equivalent models
Marque	Light commercial vehicle (LCV)	Multi purpose vehicle (MPV)
Citroën	ë-Jumpy (EU) ë-Dispatch (UK)	ë-SpaceTourer
Fiat	E-Scudo	E-Ulysse
Iveco	eJolly	-
Opel (EU)	Vivaro-e	Zafira-e Life
Peugeot	e-Expert	e-Traveller
Toyota	Proace Electric	Proace Verso Electric
Vauxhall (UK)	Vivaro Electric	Vivaro Life Electric

==== Peugeot e-Expert/e-Traveller ====
In 2019, Peugeot introduced an electric version of their Expert van called e-Expert which shares the same platform as the Vivaro-e. They later introduced an electric variant of the passenger Traveller called e-Traveller in June 2020.

Compared to the conventional diesel versions, there are some cosmetic changes such as blanked-off grille, instrument cluster which includes a battery charge-level gauge and new graphics for it infotainment system.

==== Citroën ë-Jumpy/ë-Dispatch/ë-SpaceTourer ====
The Citroën ë-Jumpy (ë-Dispatch) is largely similar to the Peugeot e-Expert cargo van, while the Citroën ë-SpaceTourer is similar to the Peugeot e-Traveller passenger van.

==== Opel Vivaro-e/Zafira-e Life ====
In April 2020, Opel revealed the all-electric Vivaro-e. The Vivaro-e is available in three lengths and offers a payload capacity of up to 1,275 kg (2,811 lbs). In the UK, the vehicle is sold under the Vauxhall brand.

The passenger model is called the Opel Zafira-e Life in mainland Europe. In the UK the Vivaro name is used.

On 18 May 2021, Opel revealed the Vivaro-e Hydrogen. This new version has a payload of 1100 kg (compared to 1200 kg for the Vivaro-e and 1400 kg for the Vivaro). The Vivaro-e Hydrogen combines a 45 kW fuel cell with a 10.5 kW lithium-ion battery. The hydrogen storage tanks are supplied by Symbio, a joint venture between Michelin and Faurecia. Peugeot then presented its e-Expert Hydrogen. These vans are manufactured at the Valenciennes plant and converted to hydrogen at the former Opel plant in Rüsselsheim.

==== Toyota Proace Electric ====
The Proace Electric, available in passenger (Verso) and cargo versions, is a Toyota-badged twin of the electric vans from Groupe PSA described above. The Proace Electric is the first all-electric passenger vehicle offered under the Toyota brand in Europe.

==== Fiat E-Scudo/E-Ulysse ====
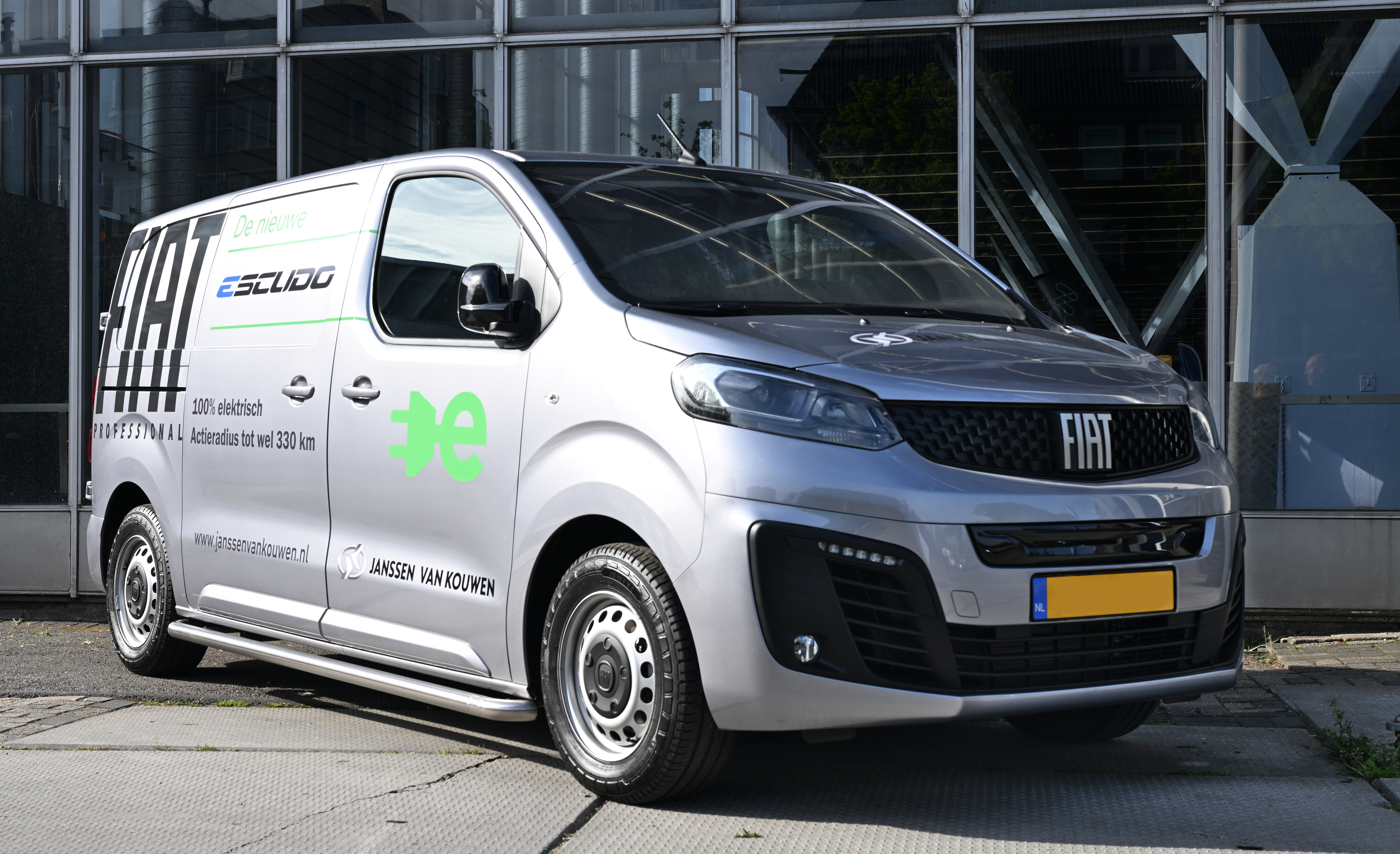
Fiat E-Scudo on display at Fully Charged in 2022

In March 2022, Fiat unveiled the E-Ulysse, a battery electric derivative of its passenger van. The cargo version is called the E-Scudo.

==== Iveco eJolly ====
In June 2025, Iveco unveiled the eJolly alongside the larger eSuperJolly, slotting under the Daily and alongside the eMoovy as Iveco's smallest electric van offerings.

=== Other versions ===
==== Ram ProMaster City ====
In March 2026, Ram Trucks unveiled the ProMaster City, replacing the previous Fiat Doblò-based model sold from 2015 to 2022. It is planned to debut in North America in early 2027, as a 2027 model. The ProMaster City will be available only in LWB spec with cargo (Tradesman) and passenger (SLT/SLT+) body styles. A 1.6-litre, turbocharged gasoline engine producing 166 hp (124 kW; 168 PS) coupled with an 8-speed automatic is the only available powertrain.

=== Hydrogen ===
On May 18, 2021, Opel presented the Vivaro-e Hydrogen. This version has a payload of 1,100 kg (2,400 lb) (contrary to 1,200 kg (2,600 lb) for the electric version and 1,400 kg (3,100 lb) for the combustion version). The Vivaro-e Hydrogen combines a 45 kW fuel cell with a 10.5 kW lithium-ion battery. The hydrogen cylinders are supplied by Symbio, a joint venture between Michelin and Faurecia. Peugeot presented its e-Expert Hydrogen a few days later and Citroën its ë-Jumpy Hydrogen. These vehicles are manufactured at the Valenciennes plant then converted to hydrogen at the former Opel plant in Rüsselheim.

=== H Van inspired derivatives ===
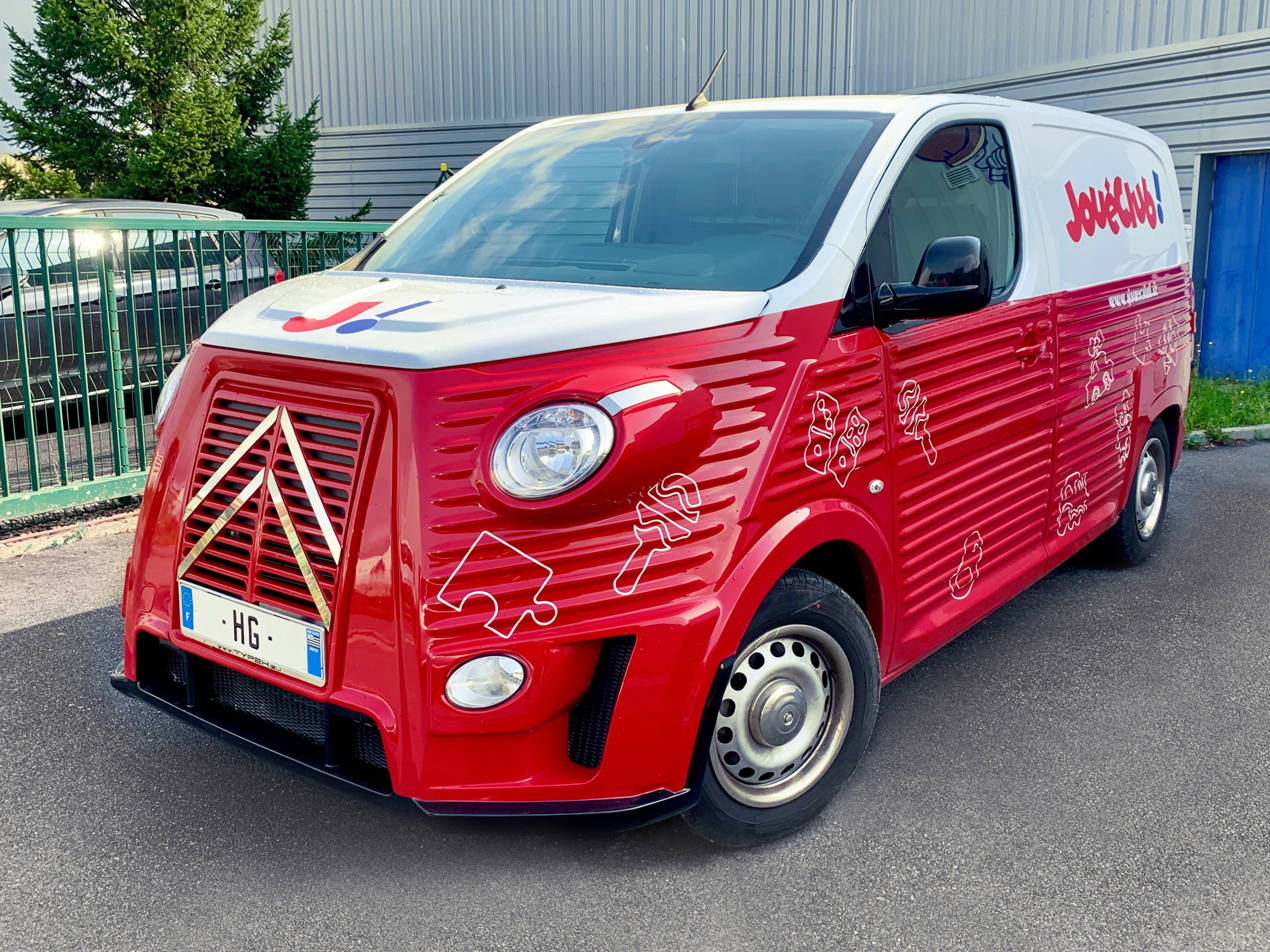
Caselani Citroën Jumpy Type HG

In 2017, Italian company FC Automobili revealed a modern interpretation of the Citroën H Van based on the Citroën Relay. The coach built, retro inspired conversion was available either pre assembled, or as a body kit, with 70 examples to be built to mark the 70th anniversary of the Citroën Type H. FC Automobili was later renamed Caselani Carrosserie, and expanded its range with a smaller 'Type HG', based on the Citroën Jumpy. Both vans are available with either internal combustion engines or electric motors.

==== Type Holidays Concept ====
At the 2023 Caravan Salon in Germany, Citroën revealed the Type Holidays, a Spacetourer based campervan with bodywork referencing the classic Citroën H Van. Styled by Caselani, The concept vehicle featured a pop-up roof with sleeping accommodation, as well as an on board kitchenette and folding bench seat. Citroën stated that the Type Holidays previewed a new range of vehicles with 'Holidays' branding, which would be aimed at van lifers and holidaymakers.

=== Safety ===
==== ANCAP ====
ANCAP test results Peugeot Expert diesel van variants (2022)
Overall
Grading:	55% (Silver)

ANCAP test results Peugeot Expert diesel van variants (2024)
Overall
Grading:	67% (Gold)

ANCAP test results Fiat Scudo (2024)
Overall
Grading:	67% (Gold)

==== Euro NCAP ====
Euro NCAP test results Citroën Jumpy (2025)
Test	Score
Overall:	4 /5 stars
Safe driving	75%
Crash avoidance	52%
Post crash	80%

Euro NCAP test results Fiat Scudo (2025)
Test	Score
Overall:	4 /5 stars
Safe driving	75%
Crash avoidance	52%
Post crash	80%

Euro NCAP test results Opel Vivaro (2025)
Test	Score
Overall:	4 /5 stars
Safe driving	75%
Crash avoidance	52%
Post crash	80%

Euro NCAP test results Peugeot Expert (2025)
Test	Score
Overall:	4 /5 stars
Safe driving	75%
Crash avoidance	52%
Post crash	80%

Euro NCAP test results Toyota PROACE (2025)
Test	Score
Overall:	4 /5 stars
Safe driving	75%
Crash avoidance	52%
Post crash	80%

=== Engines (2016–2025) ===
Engines
Model	Engine	Displacement	Valvetrain	Fuel system	Max. power at rpm	Max. torque at rpm	Gearbox	Years
Diesel engines
95 Multijet	Ford DLD-416	1,560 cc	DOHC 16v	Common rail direct injection	90 hp (67 kW; 91 PS) @ 3,750 rpm	210 N⋅m (155 lb⋅ft) @ 1,750 rpm	5 speed manual	2016–2019
115 Multijet	Ford DLD-416	1,560 cc	DOHC 16v	Common rail direct injection	115 hp (86 kW; 117 PS) @ 3,500 rpm	300 N⋅m (221 lb⋅ft) @ 1,750 rpm	6 speed manual	2016–2025
120 Multijet	PSA DW10	1,997 cc	DOHC 16v	Common rail direct injection	120 hp (89 kW; 122 PS) @ 3,750 rpm	340 N⋅m (251 lb⋅ft) @ 2,000 rpm	6 speed manual	2016–2025
150 Multijet	PSA DW10	1,997 cc	DOHC 16v	Common rail direct injection	150 hp (112 kW; 152 PS) @ 4,000 rpm	370 N⋅m (273 lb⋅ft) @ 2,000 rpm	6 speed manual	2016–2025
180 Multijet	PSA DW10	1,997 cc	DOHC 16v	Common rail direct injection	177 hp (132 kW; 179 PS) @ 3,750 rpm	400 N⋅m (295 lb⋅ft) @ 2,000 rpm	6 speed automatic 8 speed automatic	2016–2019 2019–2025
Electric	-	-	-	-	134 hp (100 kW; 136 PS)	260 N⋅m (192 lb⋅ft)	-	2020–2025

=== Gallery ===
==== Commercial versions ====
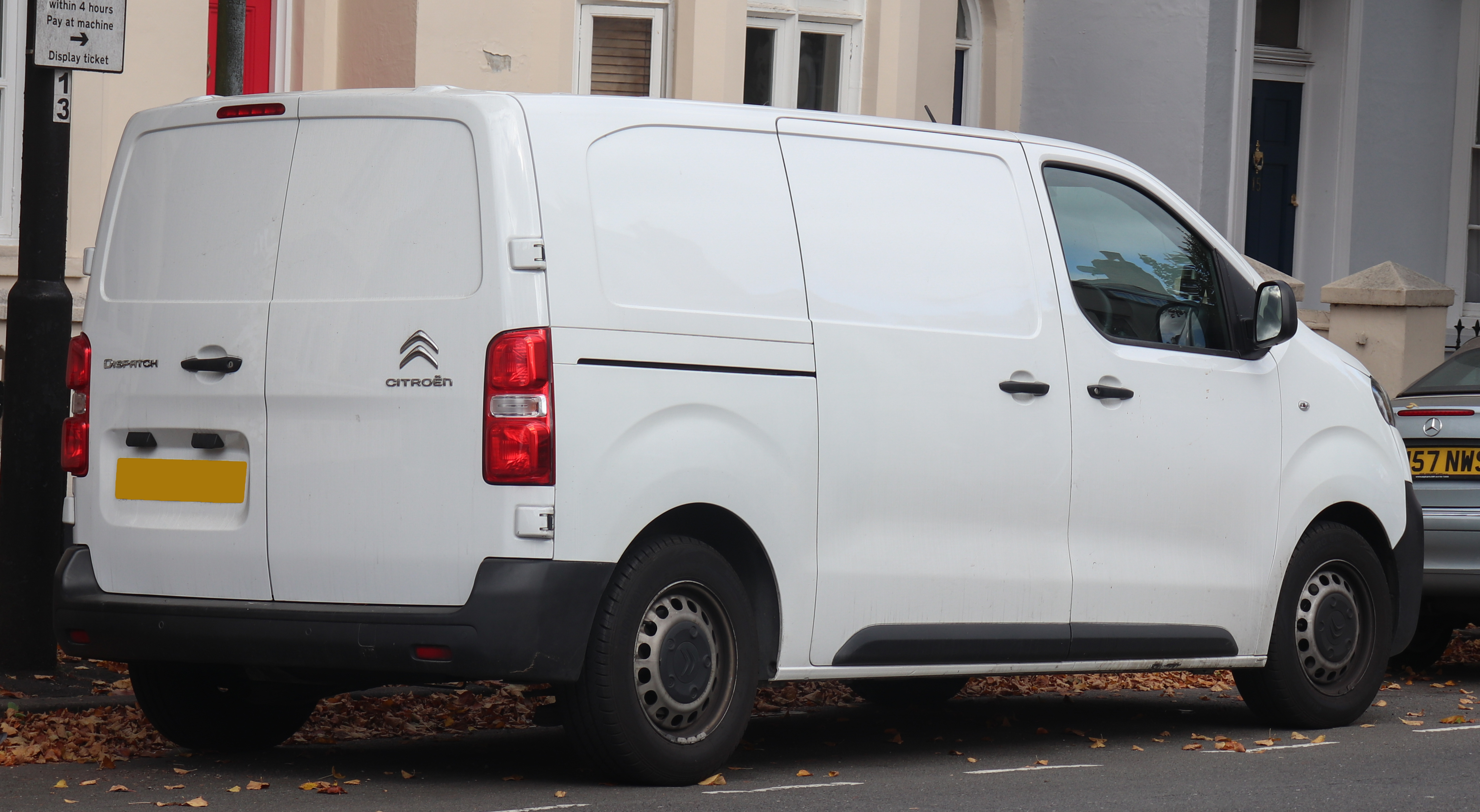
Citroën Dispatch (UK)

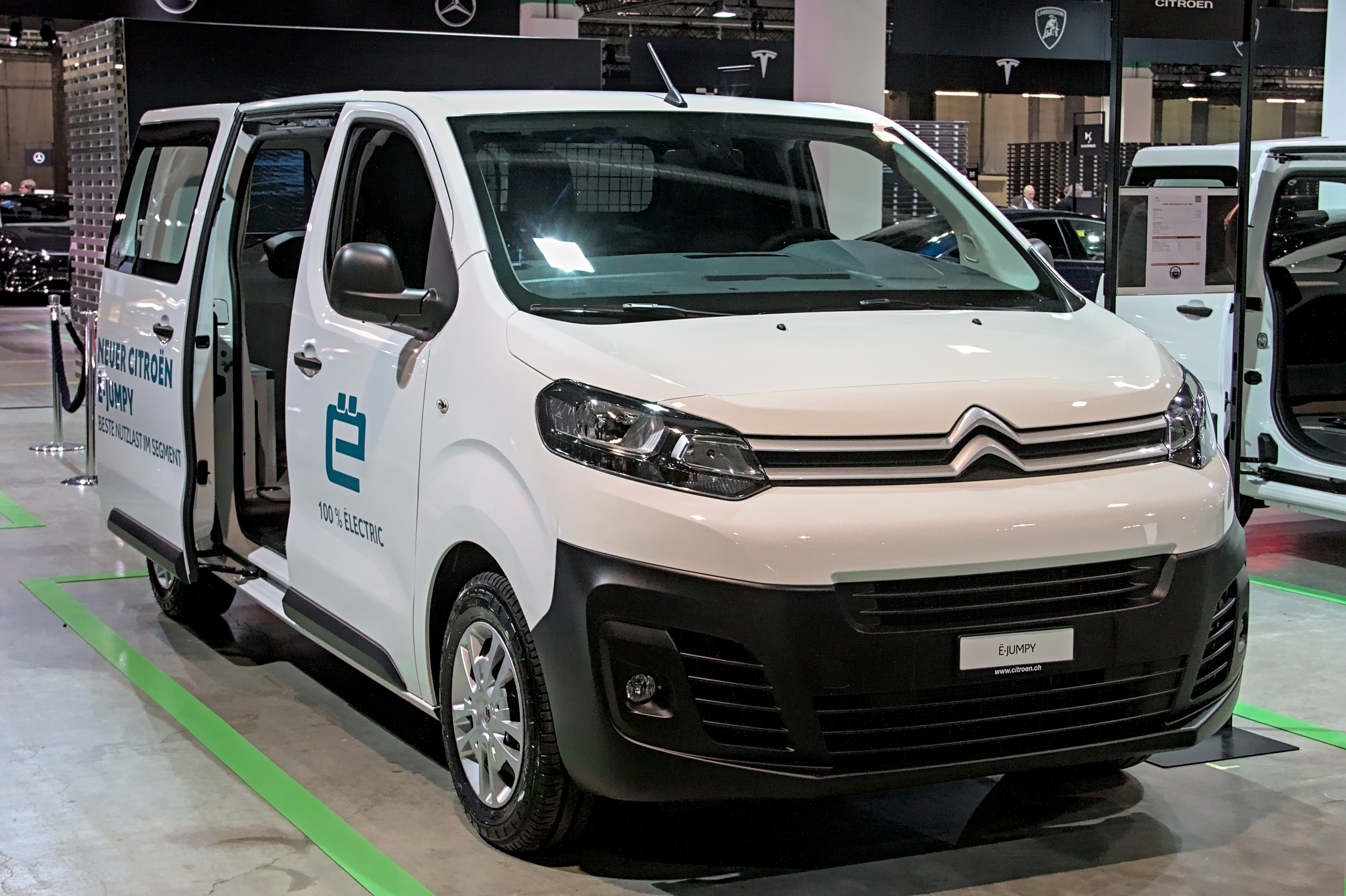
Citroën ë-Jumpy

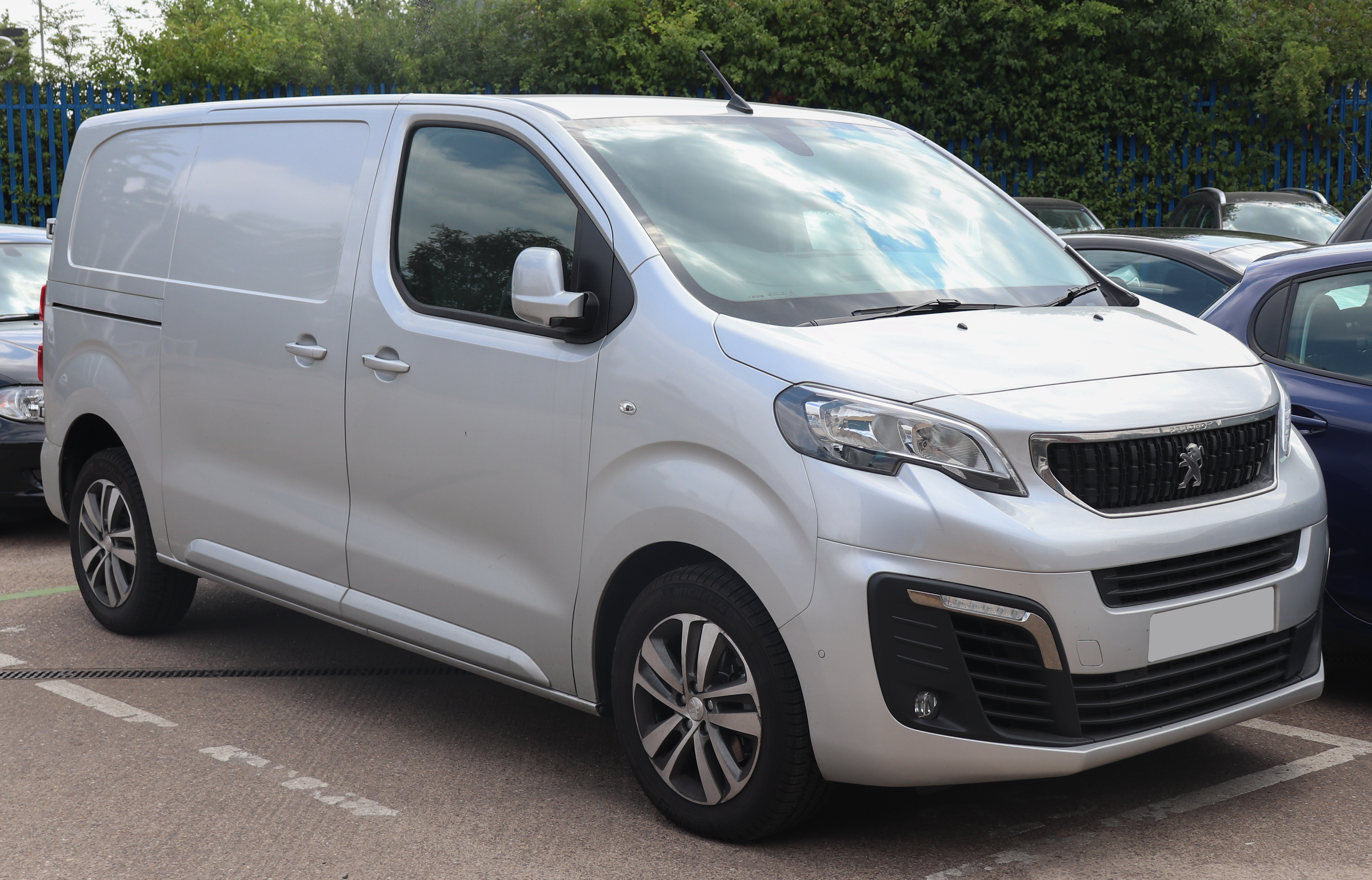
Peugeot Expert

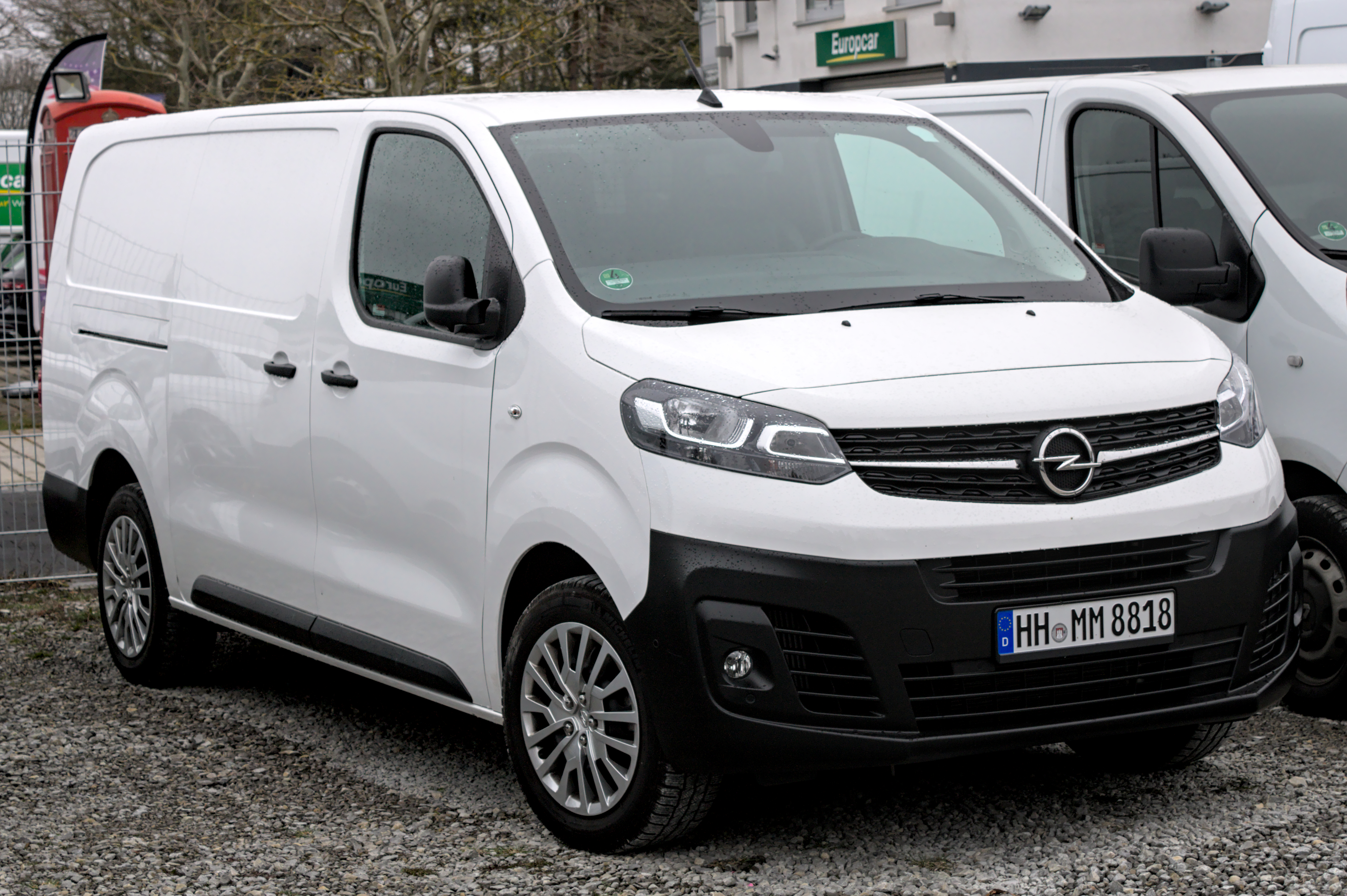
Opel Vivaro

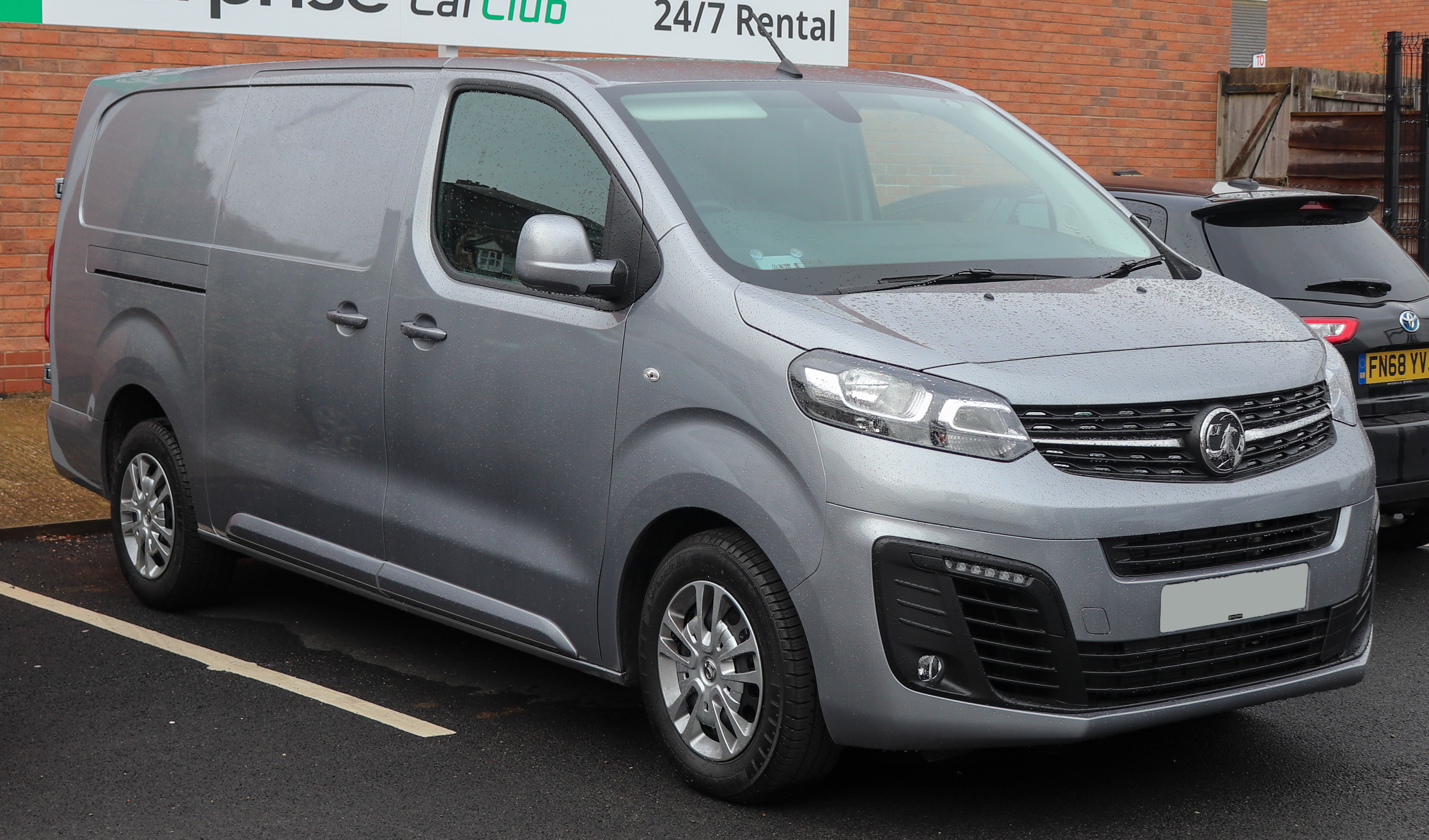
Vauxhall Vivaro

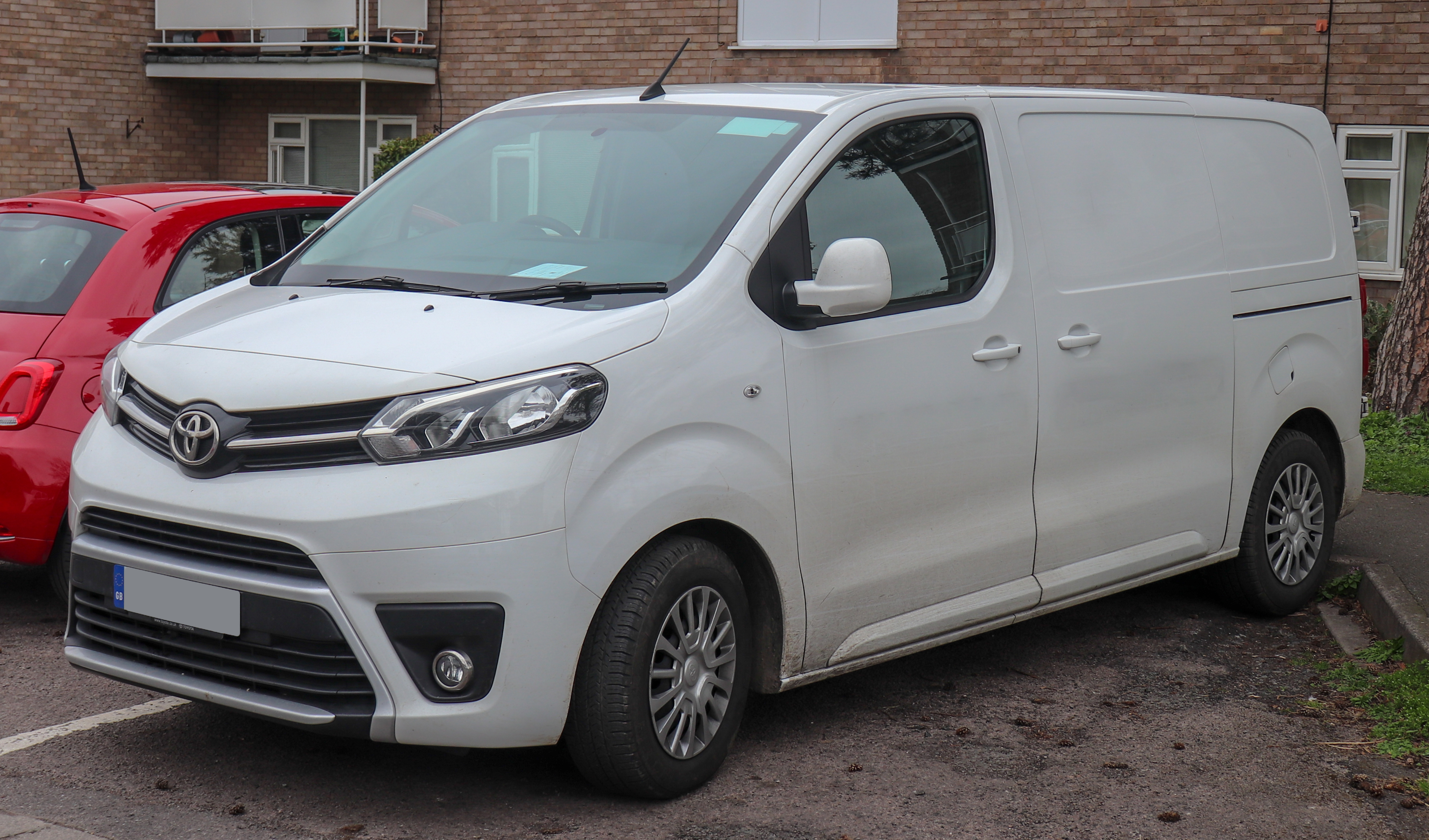
Toyota Proace

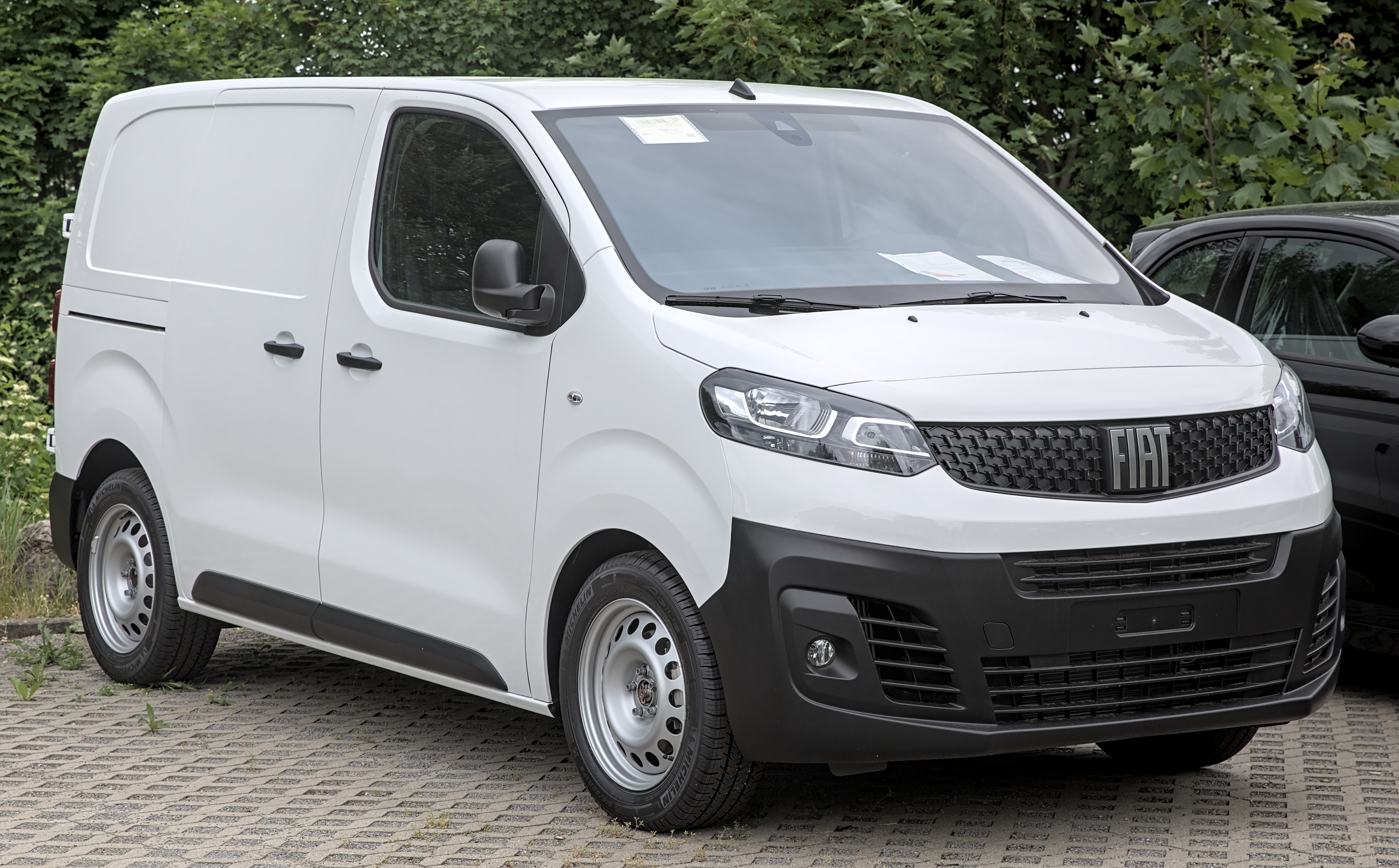
Fiat Scudo

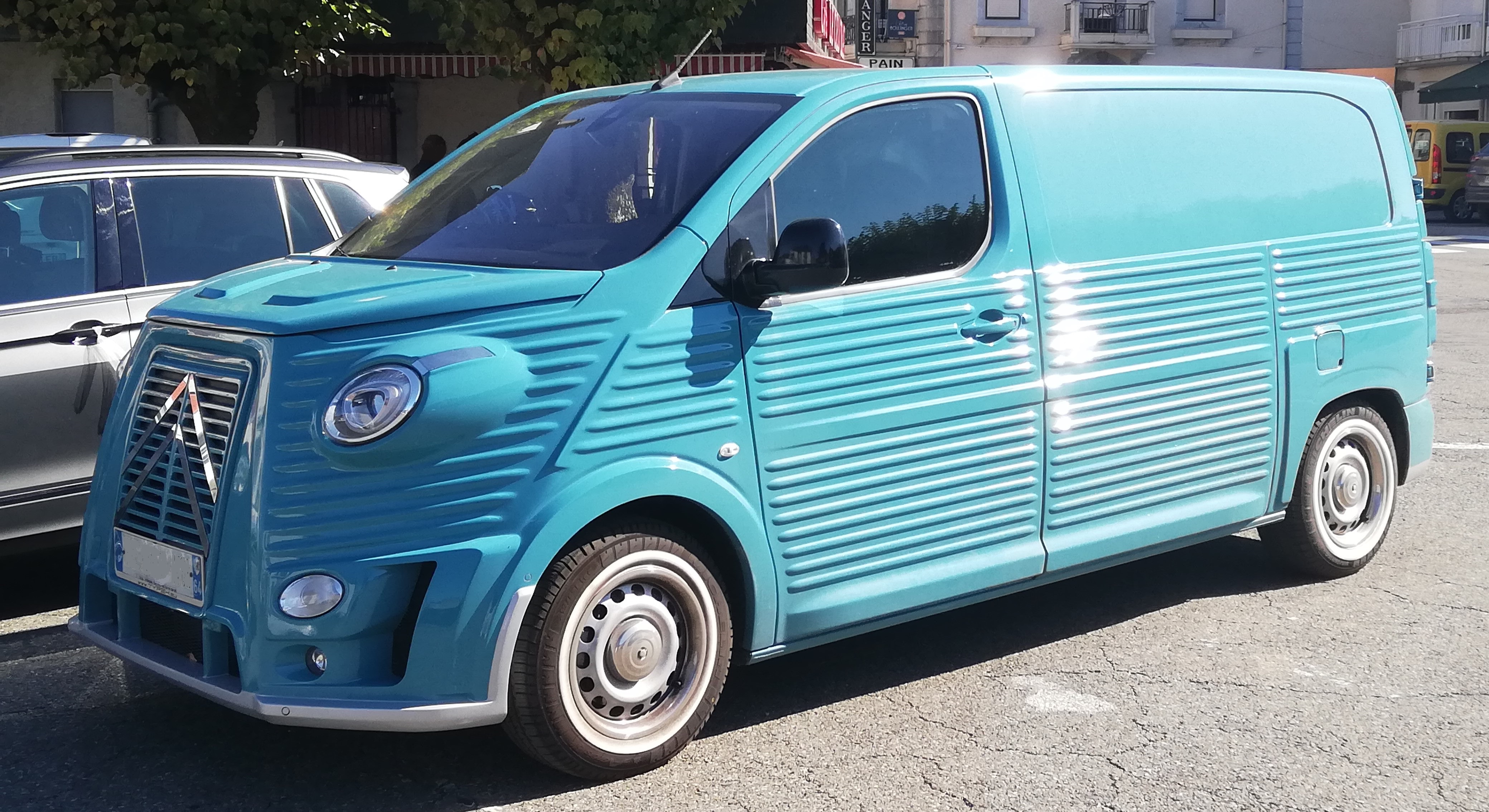
Caselani Citroën Jumpy Type HG

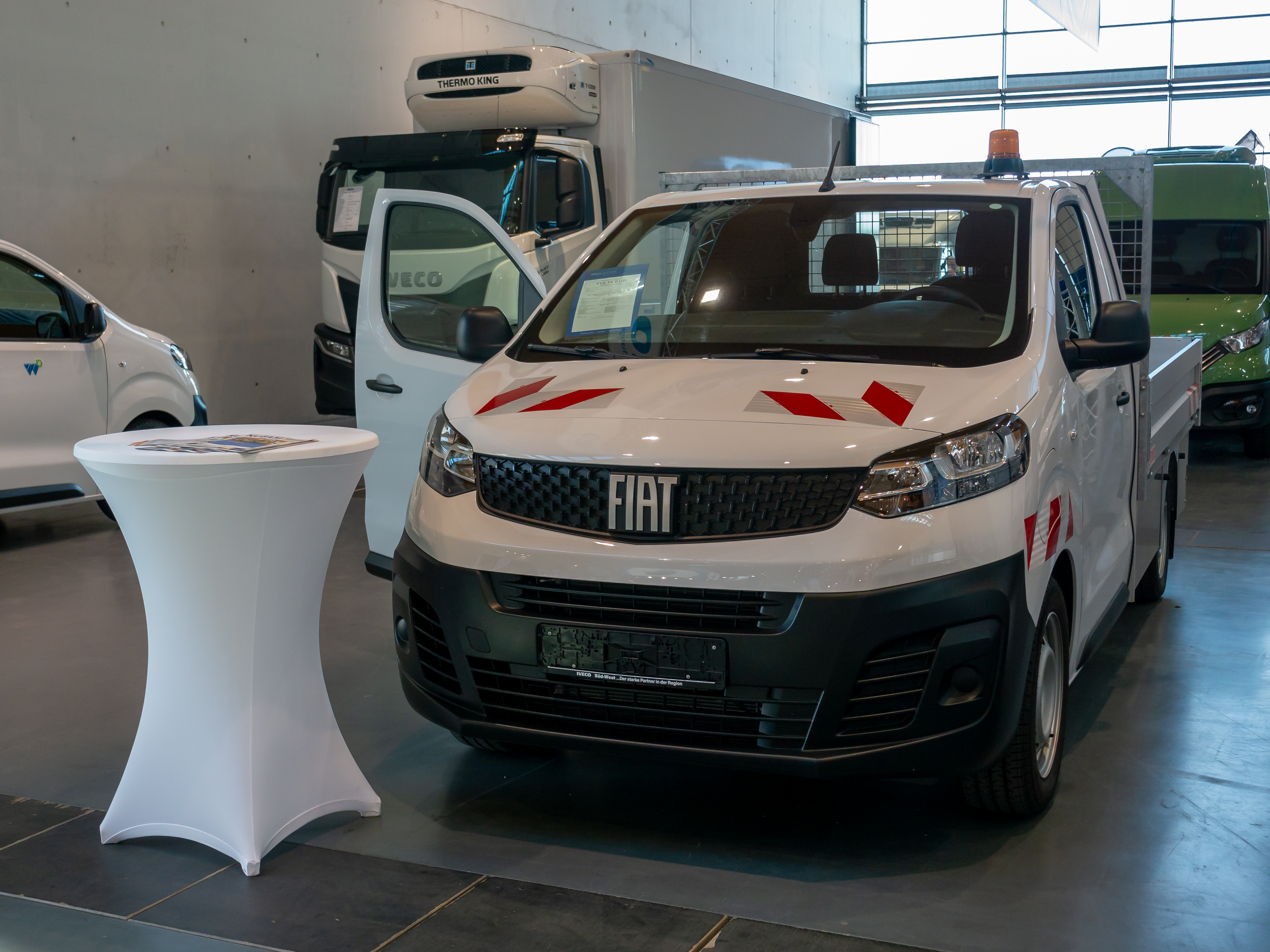
Fiat Scudo Pickup version

==== Passenger versions ====
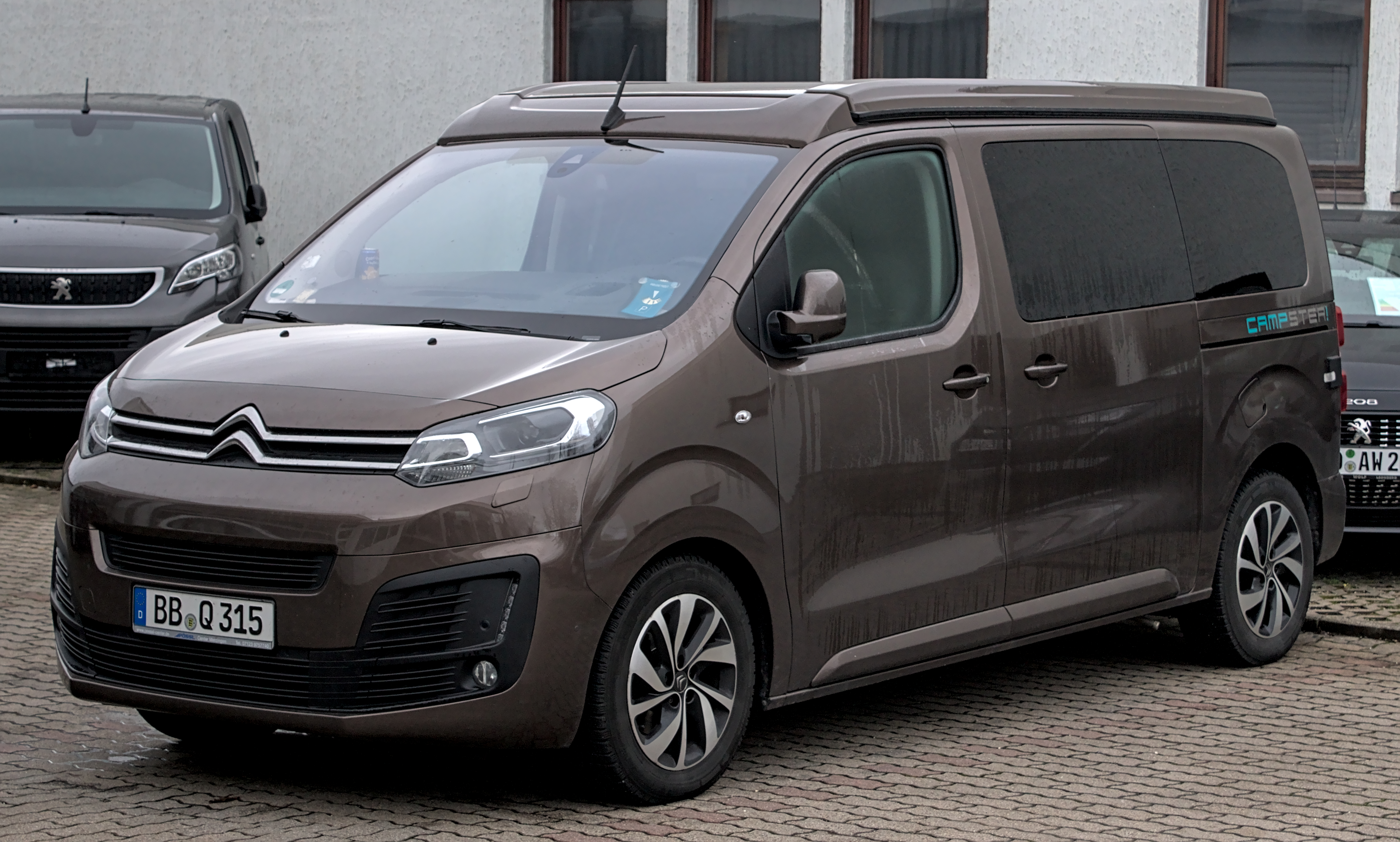
Citroën SpaceTourer

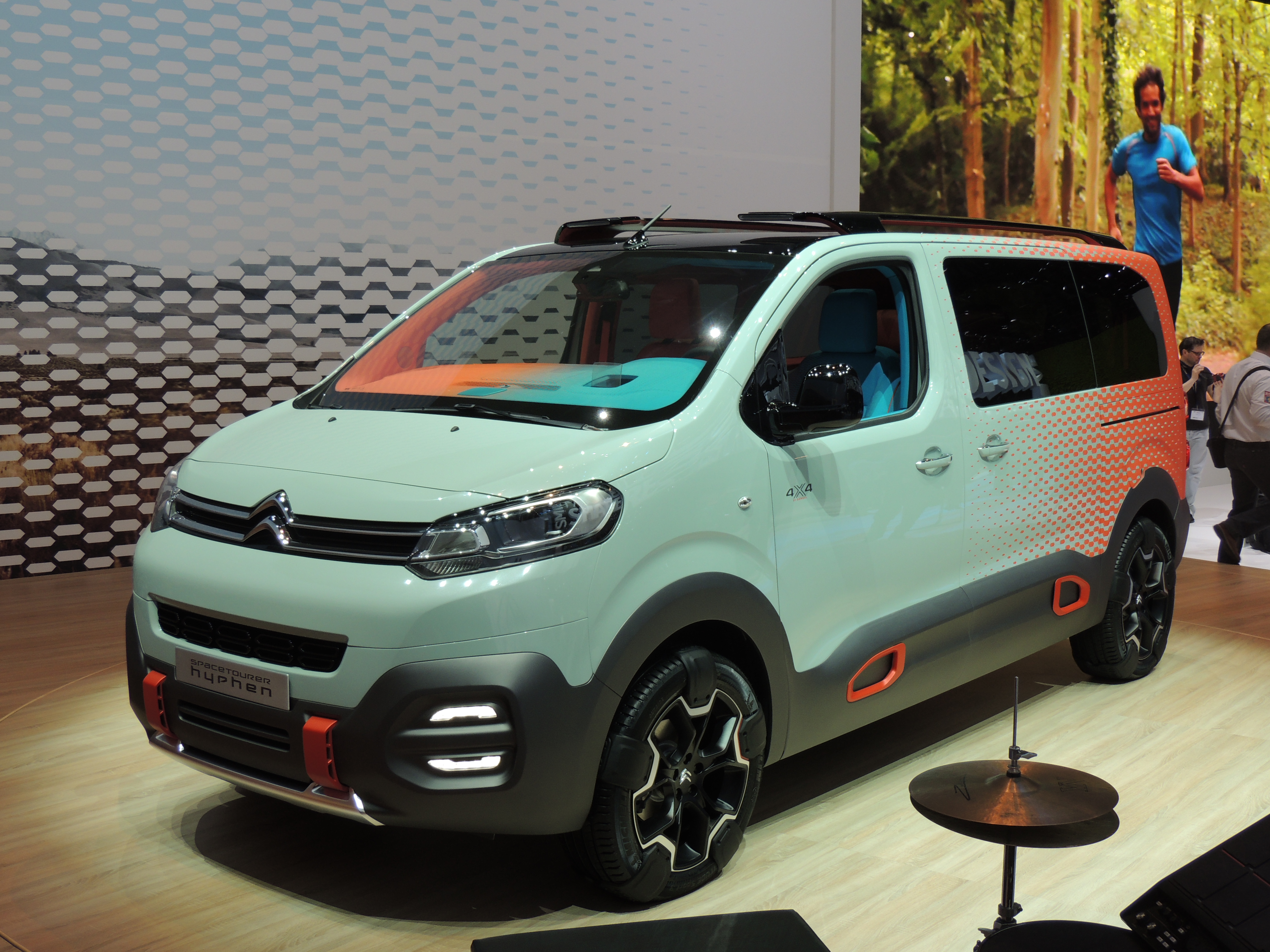
Citroën SpaceTourer Hyphen Concept

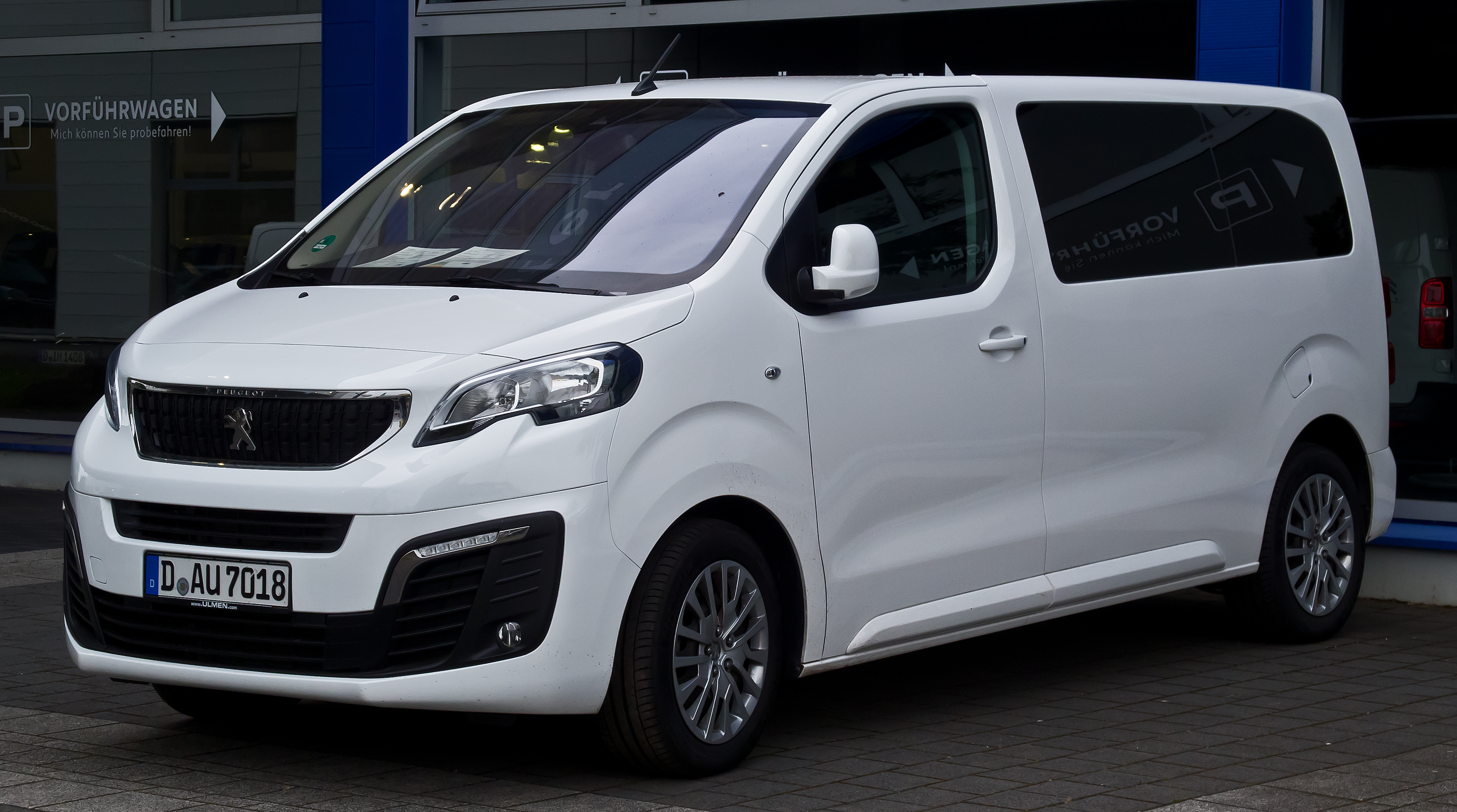
Peugeot Traveller

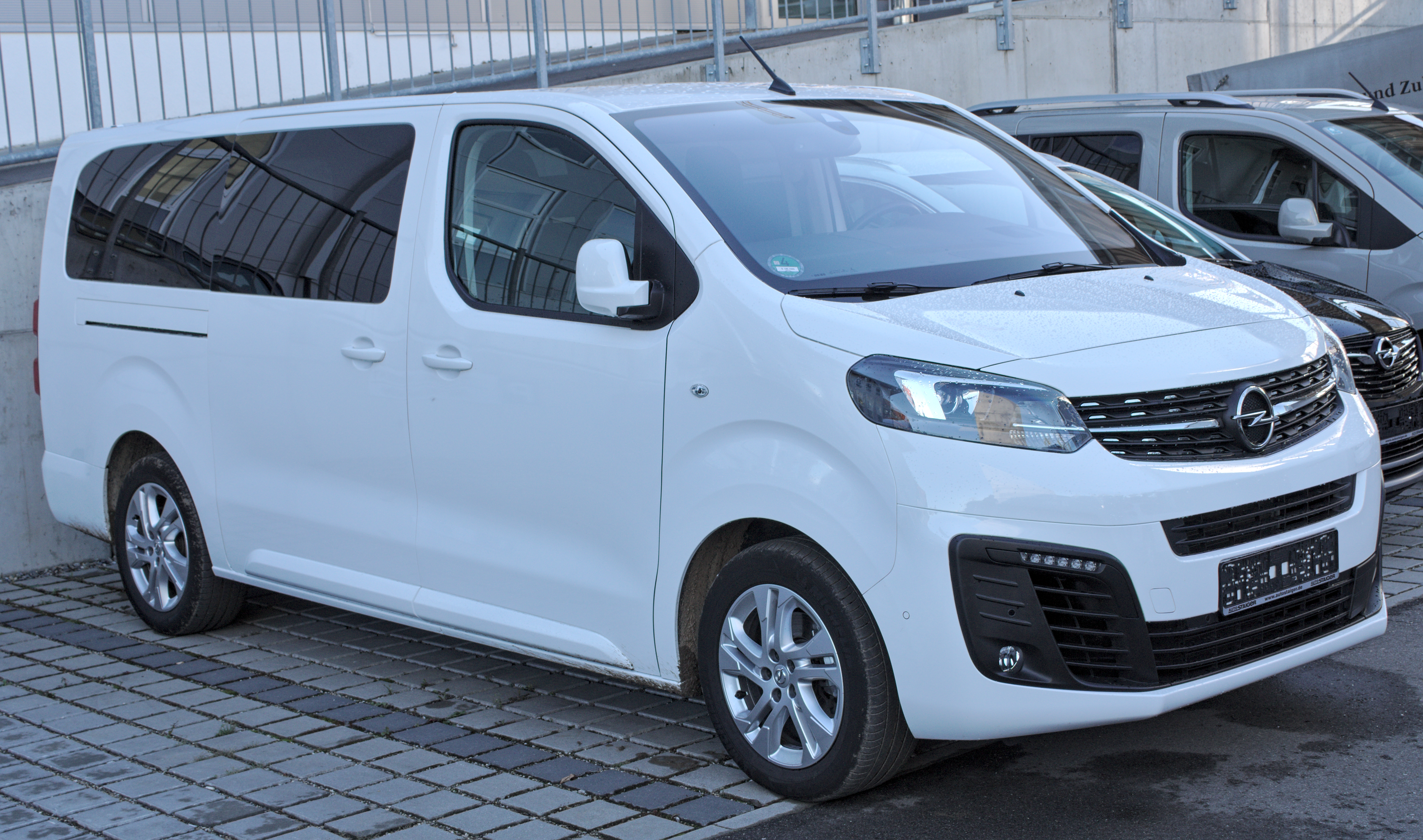
Opel Zafira Life

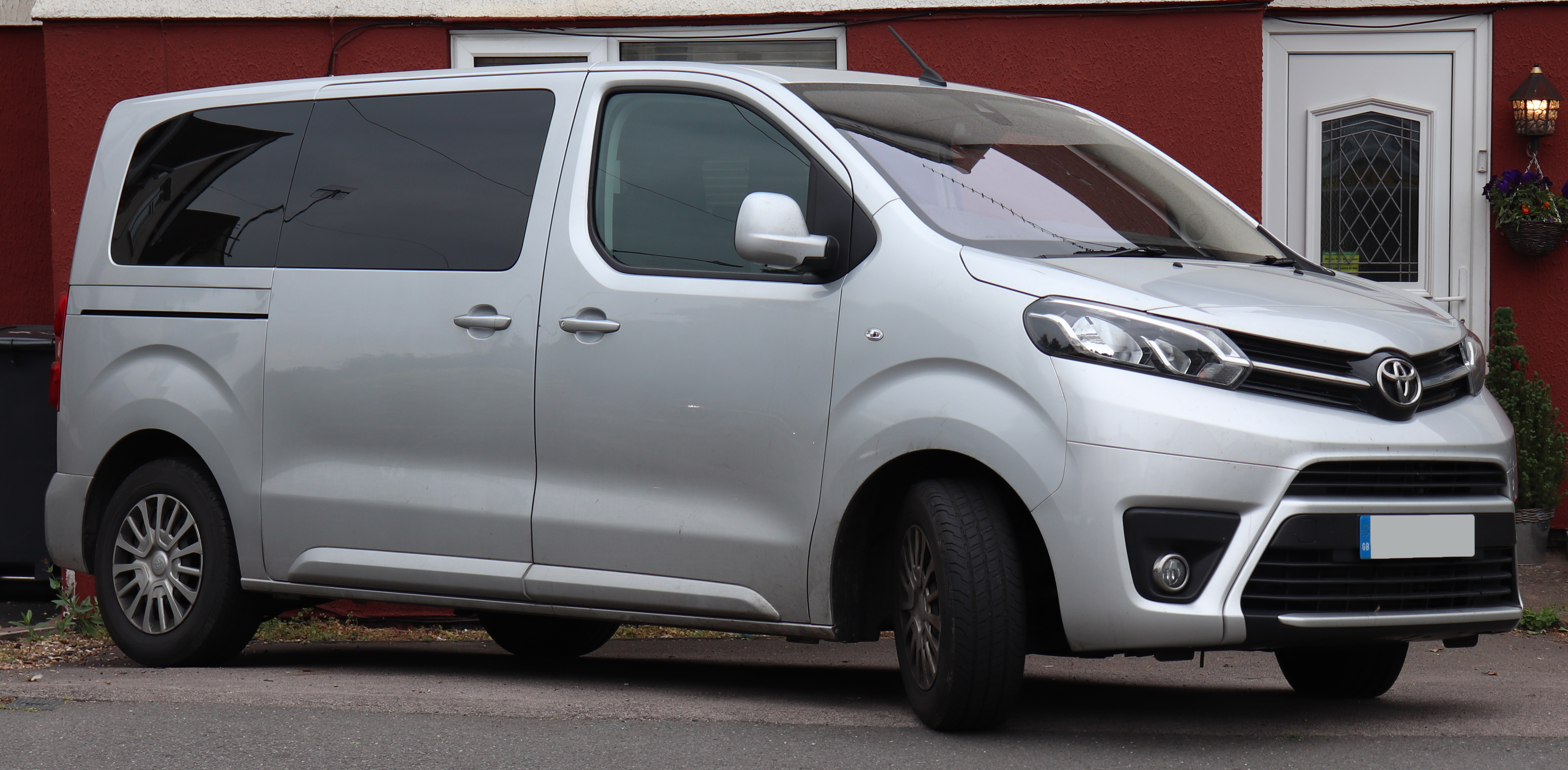
Toyota Proace Verso

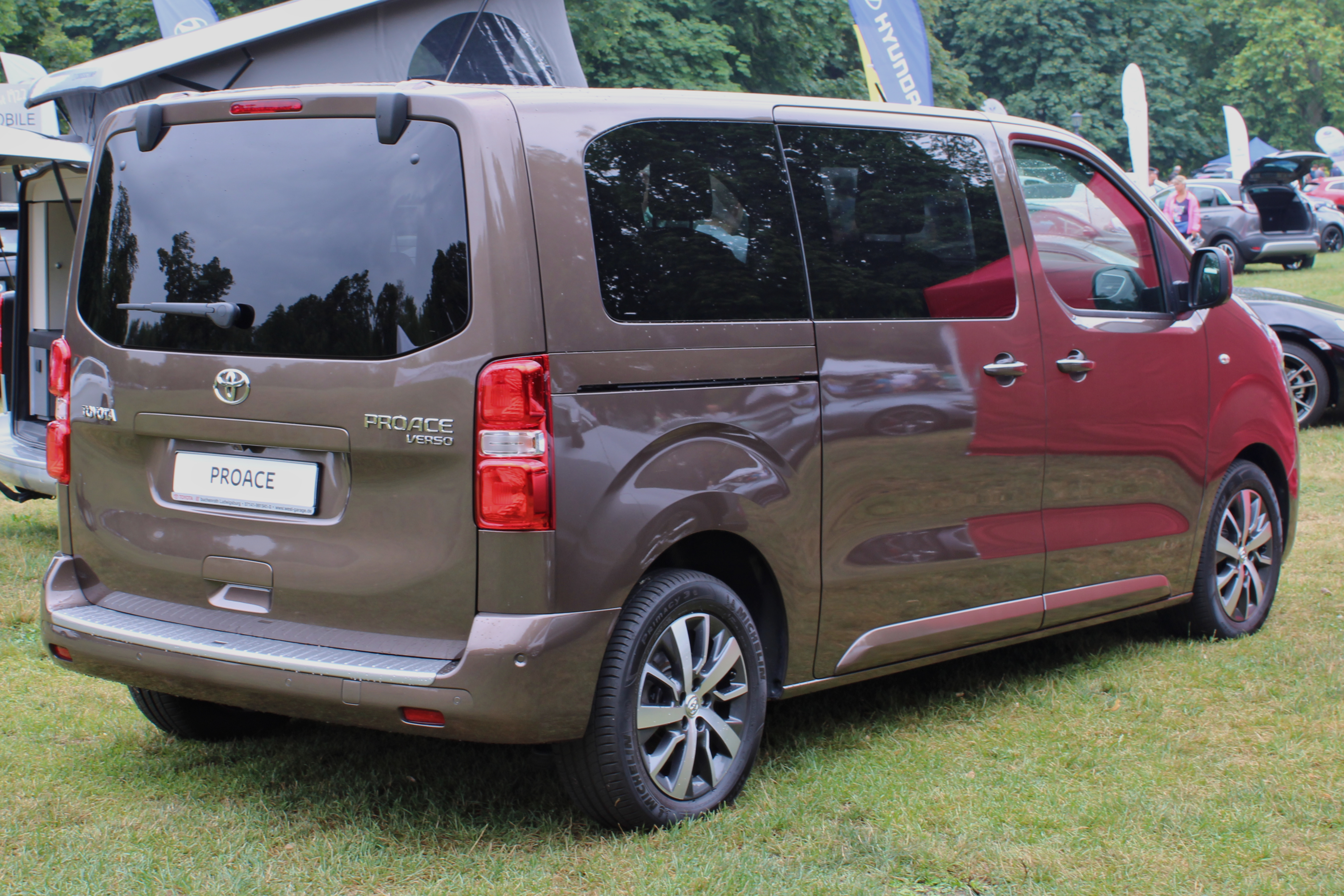
Toyota Proace Verso

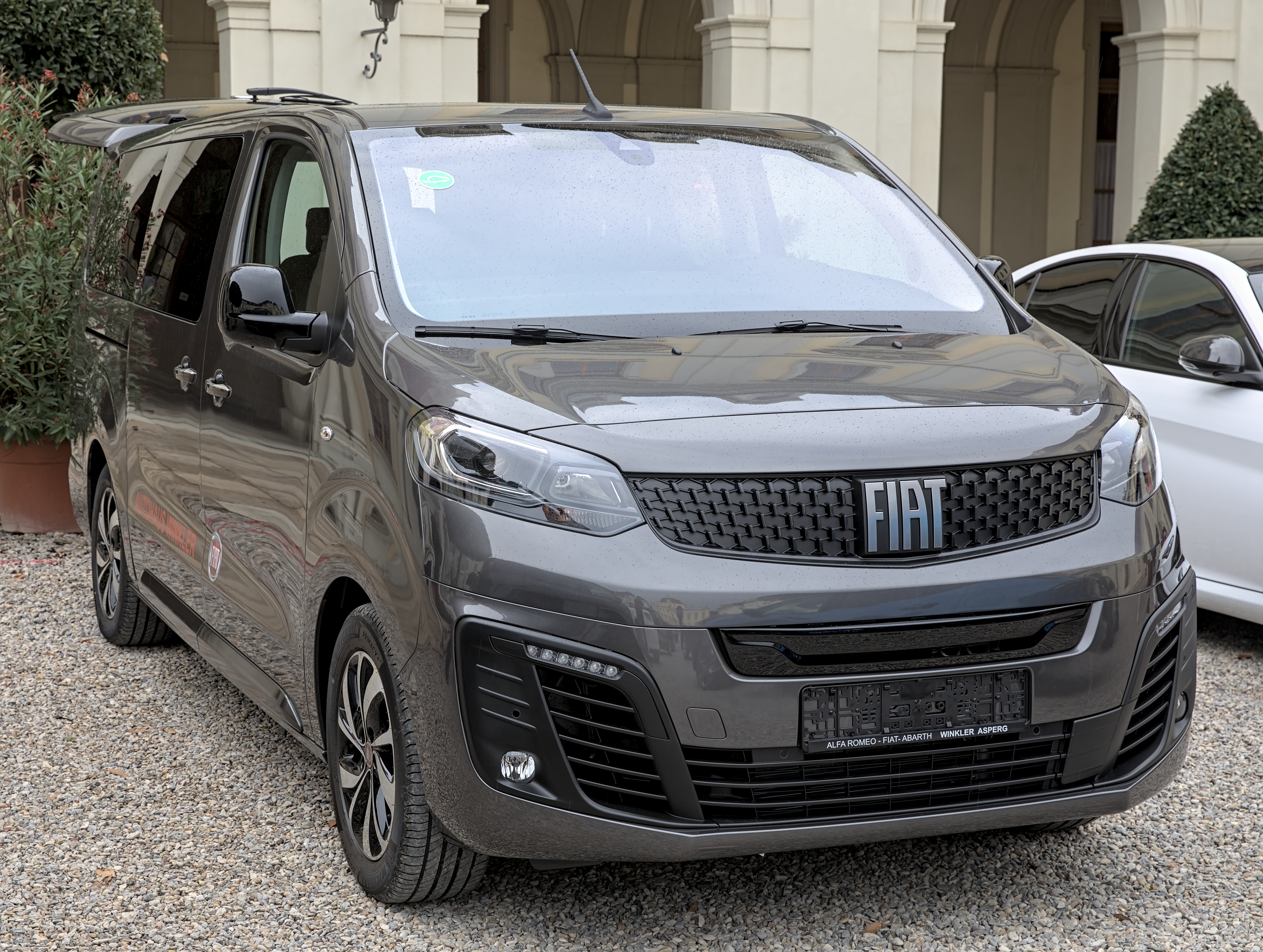
Fiat E-Ulysse

=== Facelift ===
Stellantis introduced facelifts for the vans on October 23, 2023. In all versions, the upper grill has been completely removed for reduced air resistance. Each van has been given a larger, 10-inch infotainment display, and new driver-assistance systems including Level 2 autonomous driving capabilities. The Citroën, Peugeot, Opel, Vauxhall and Toyota vans had also been fitted with the brand's respective updated logo. While still called the Zafira Life, the small "Life" logos have been removed from the Opel and Vauxhall passenger models.

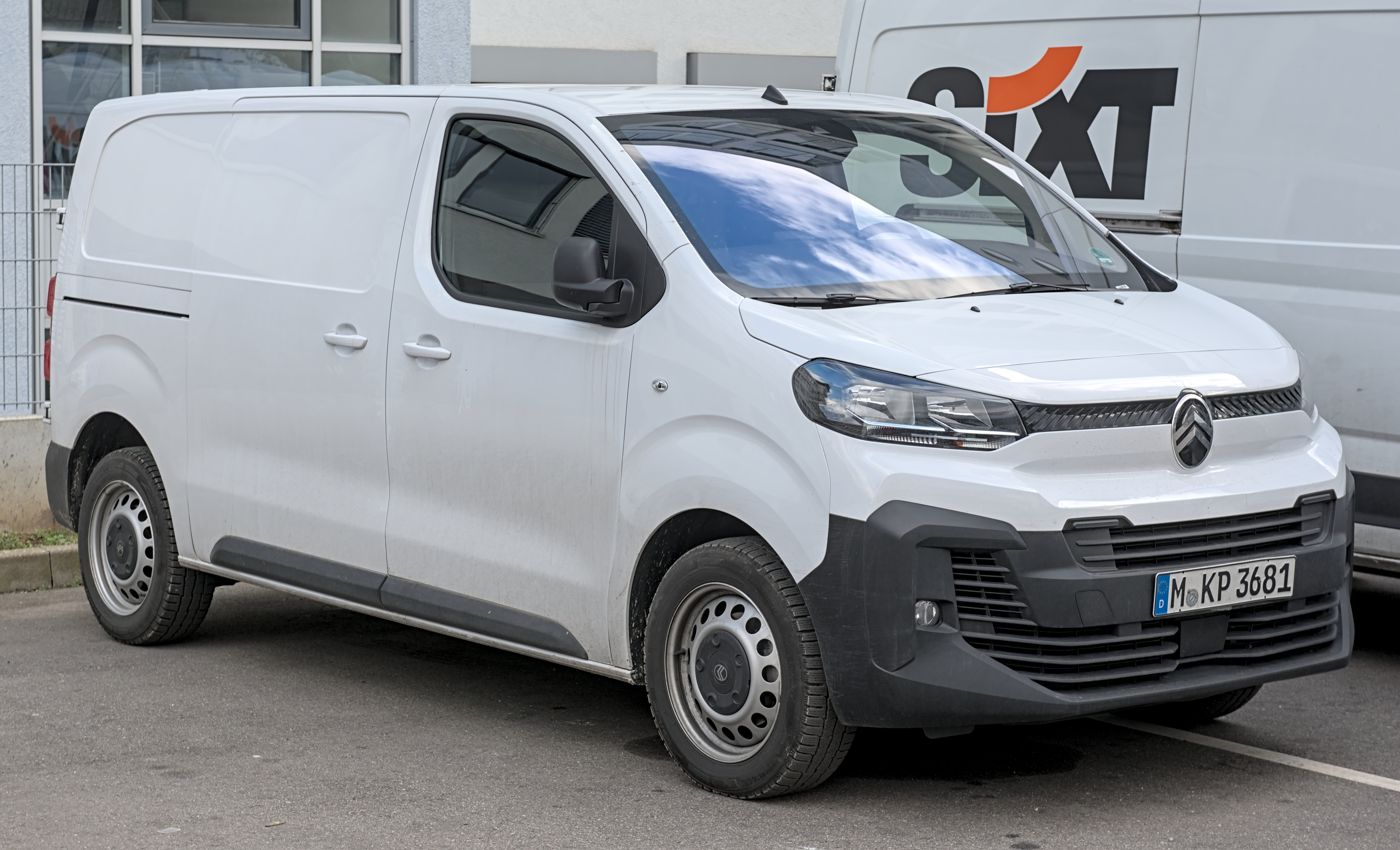
2024 Citroën Jumpy

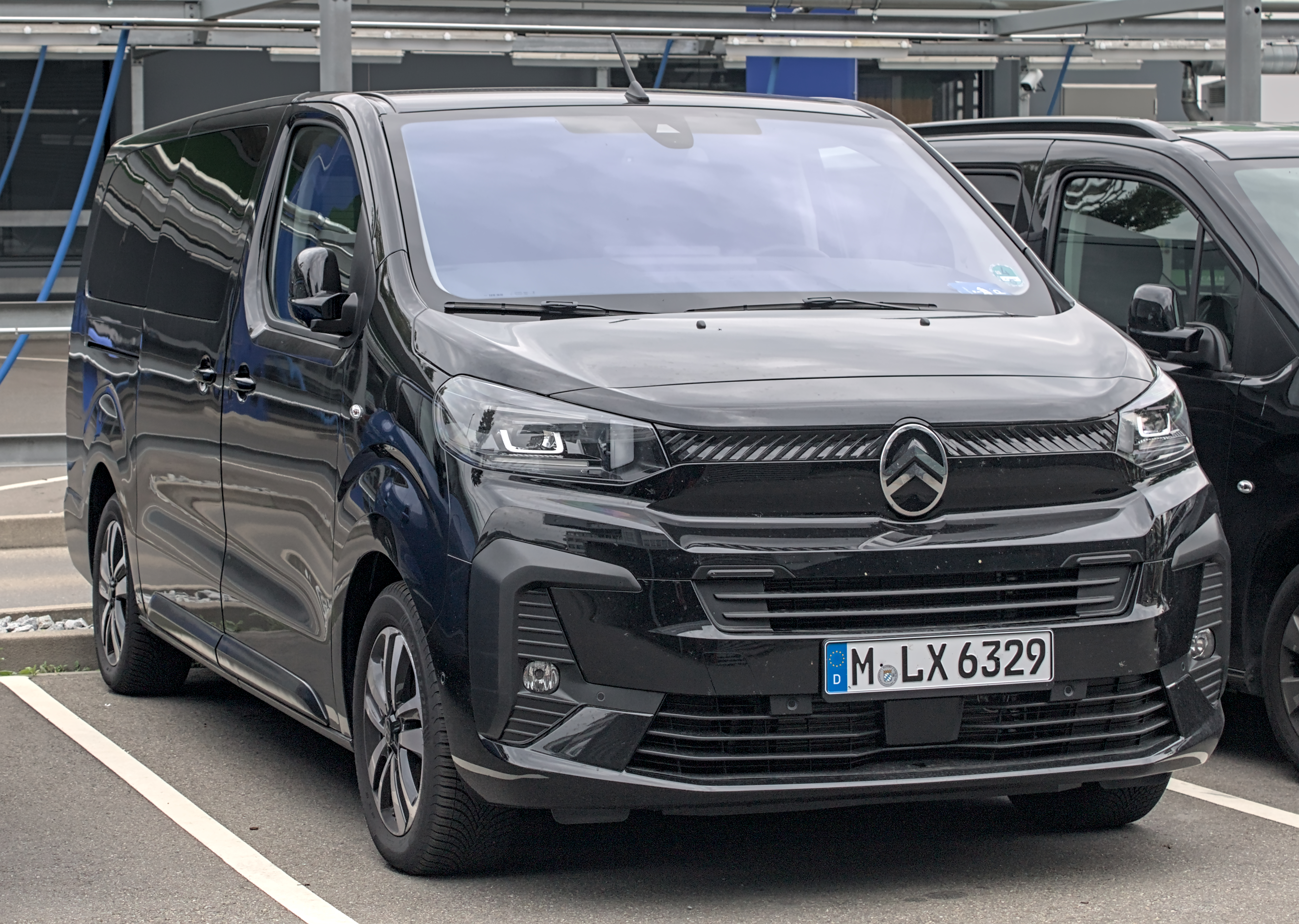
2024 Citroën SpaceTourer

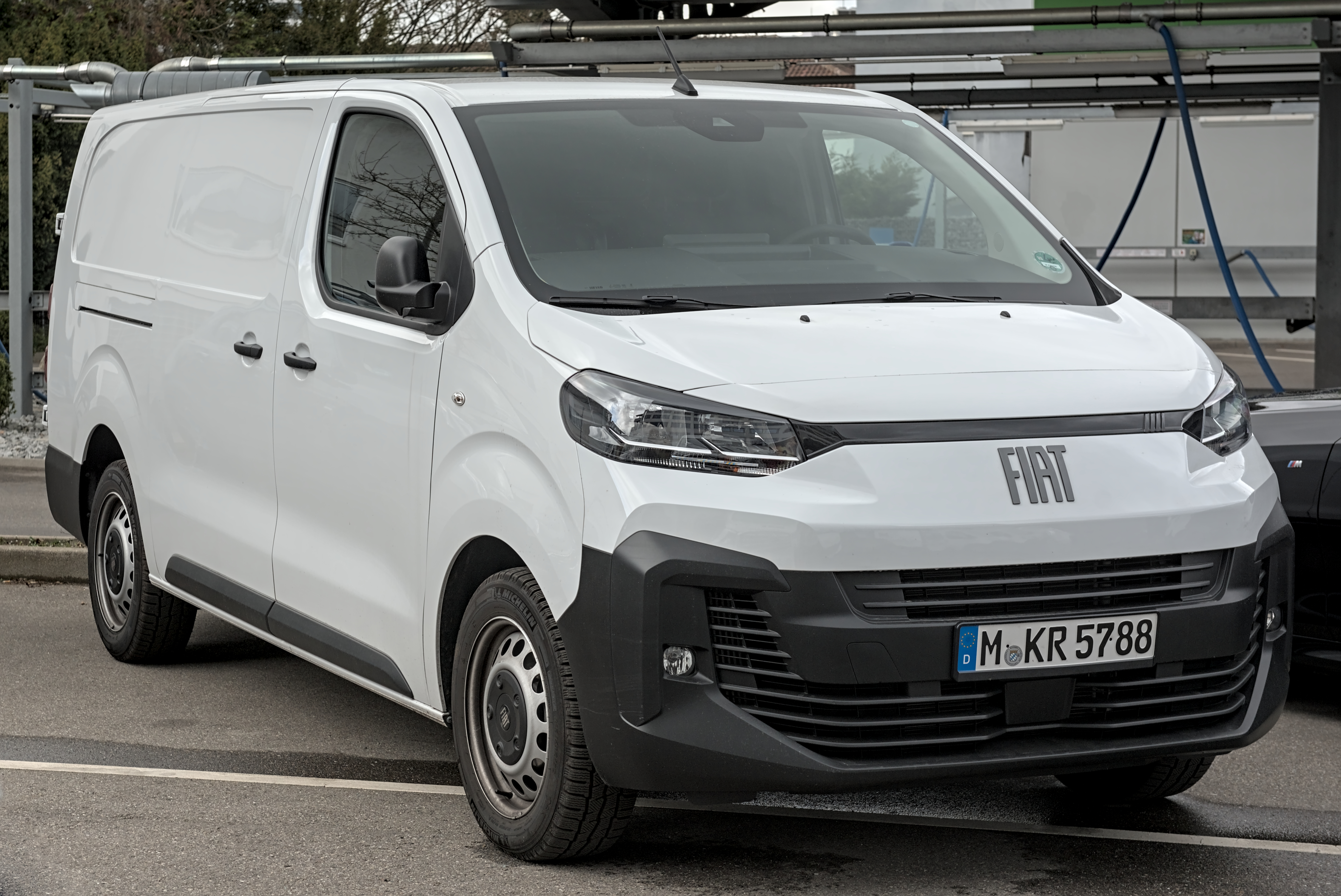
2024 Fiat Scudo

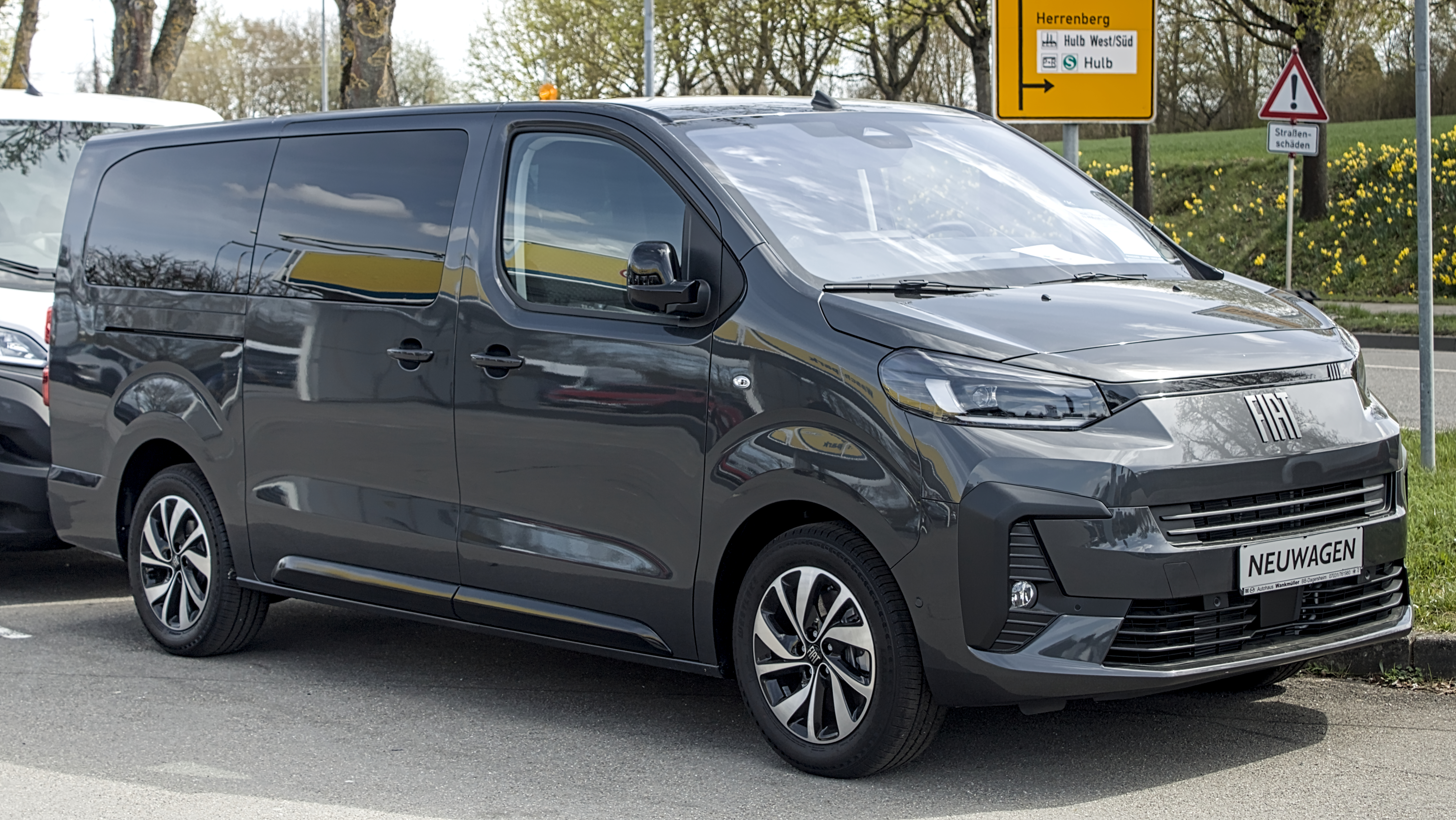
2024 Fiat Ulysse

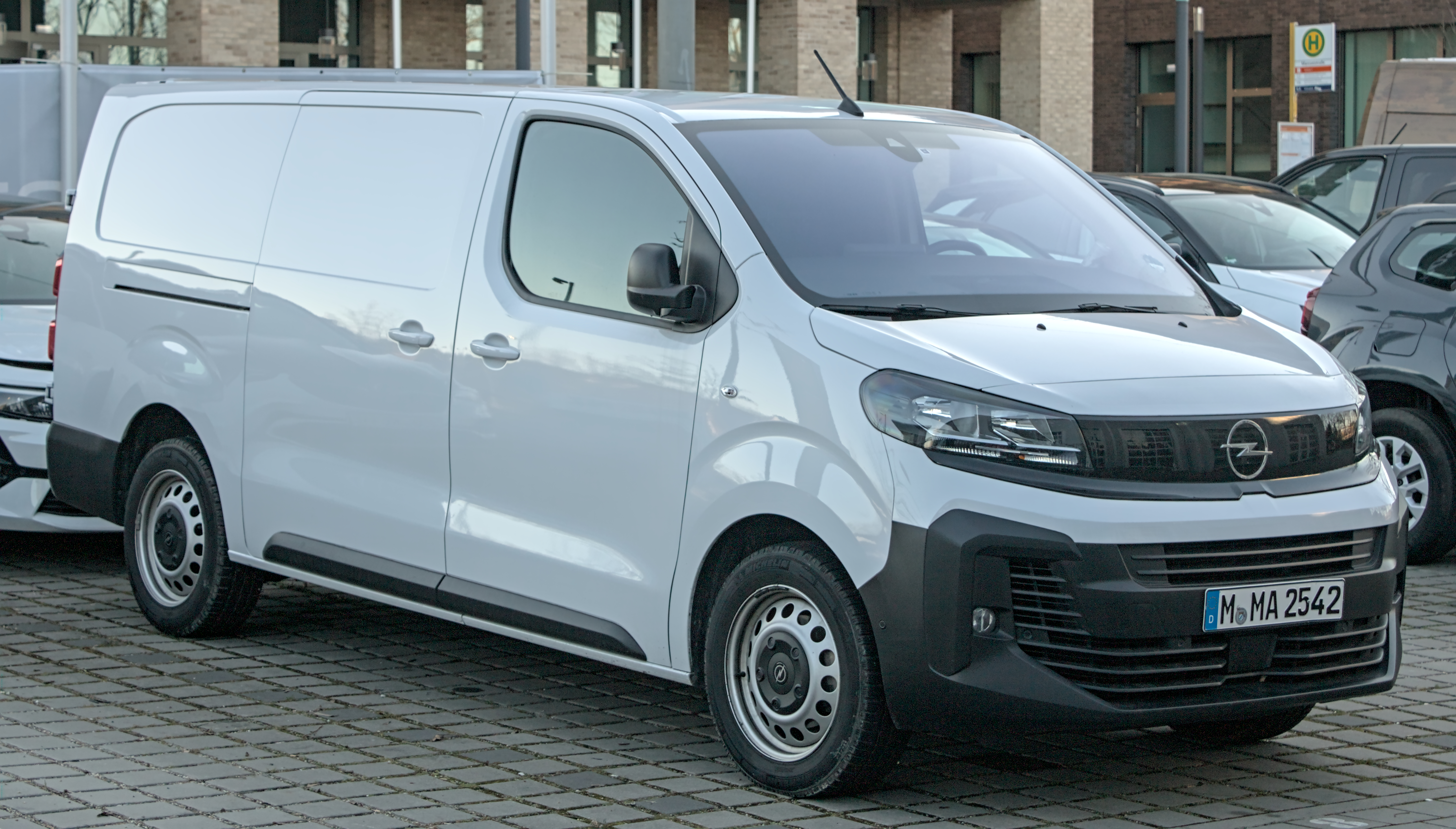
2024 Opel Vivaro

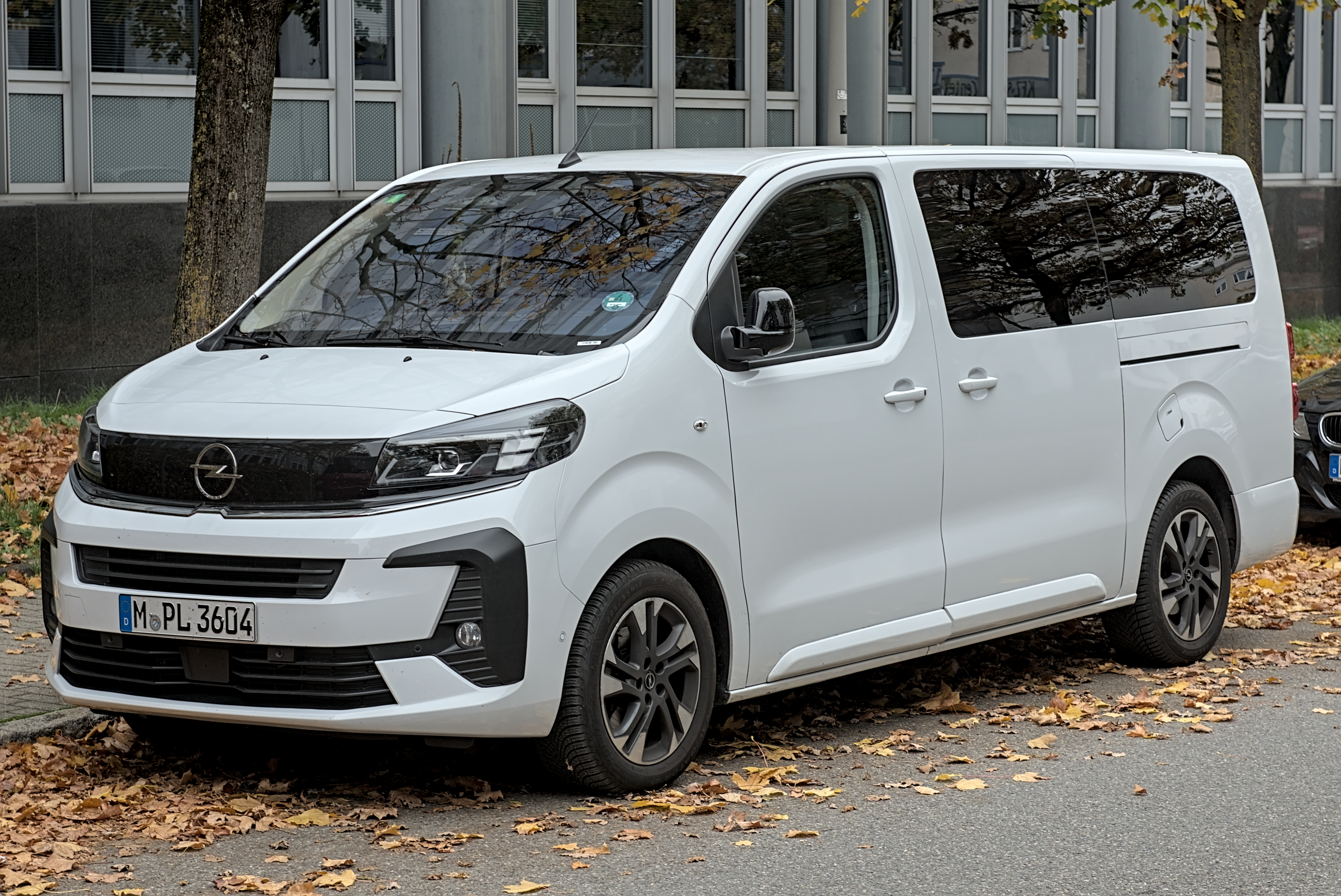
2024 Opel Zafira Life

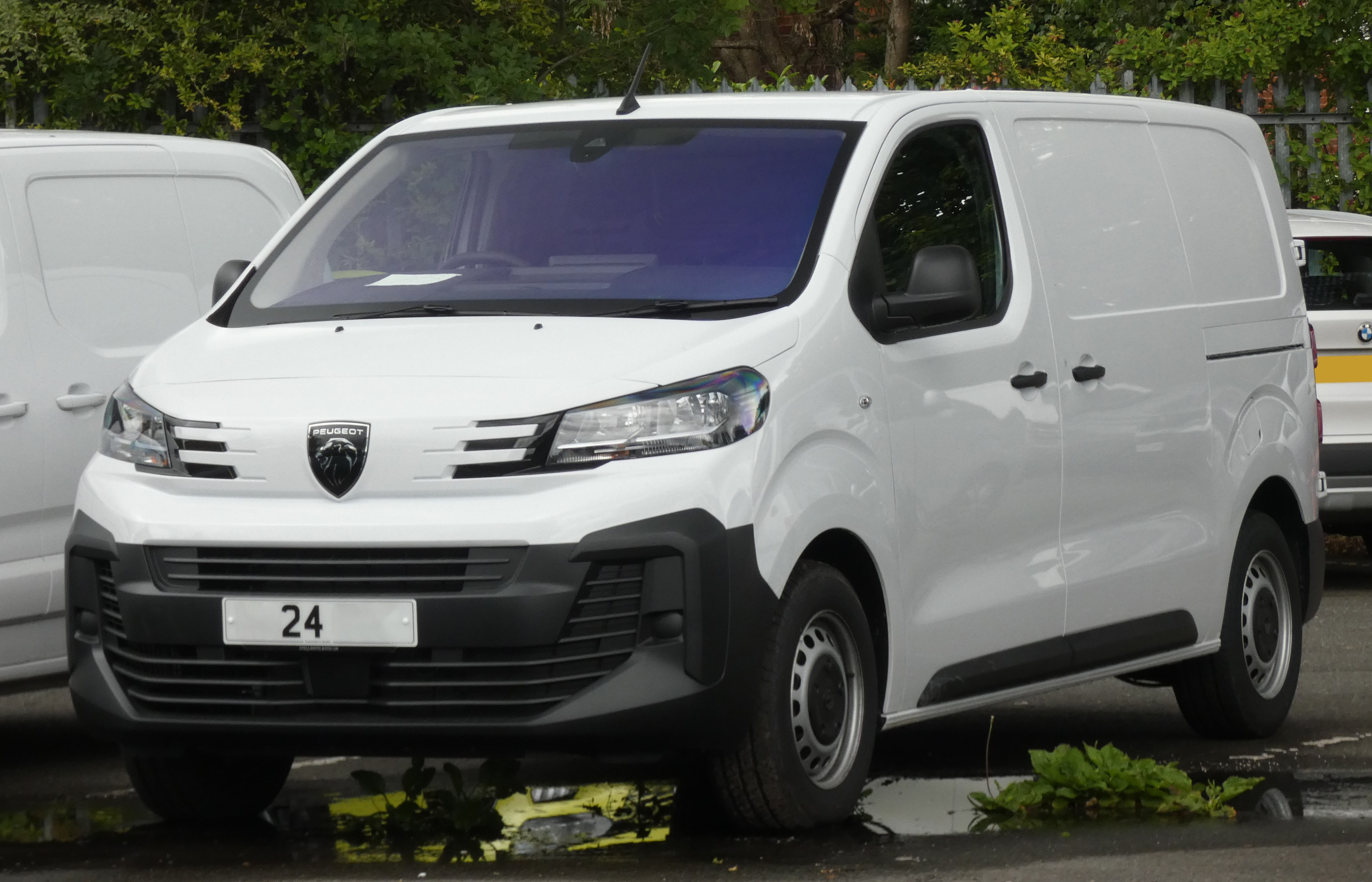
2024 Peugeot Expert

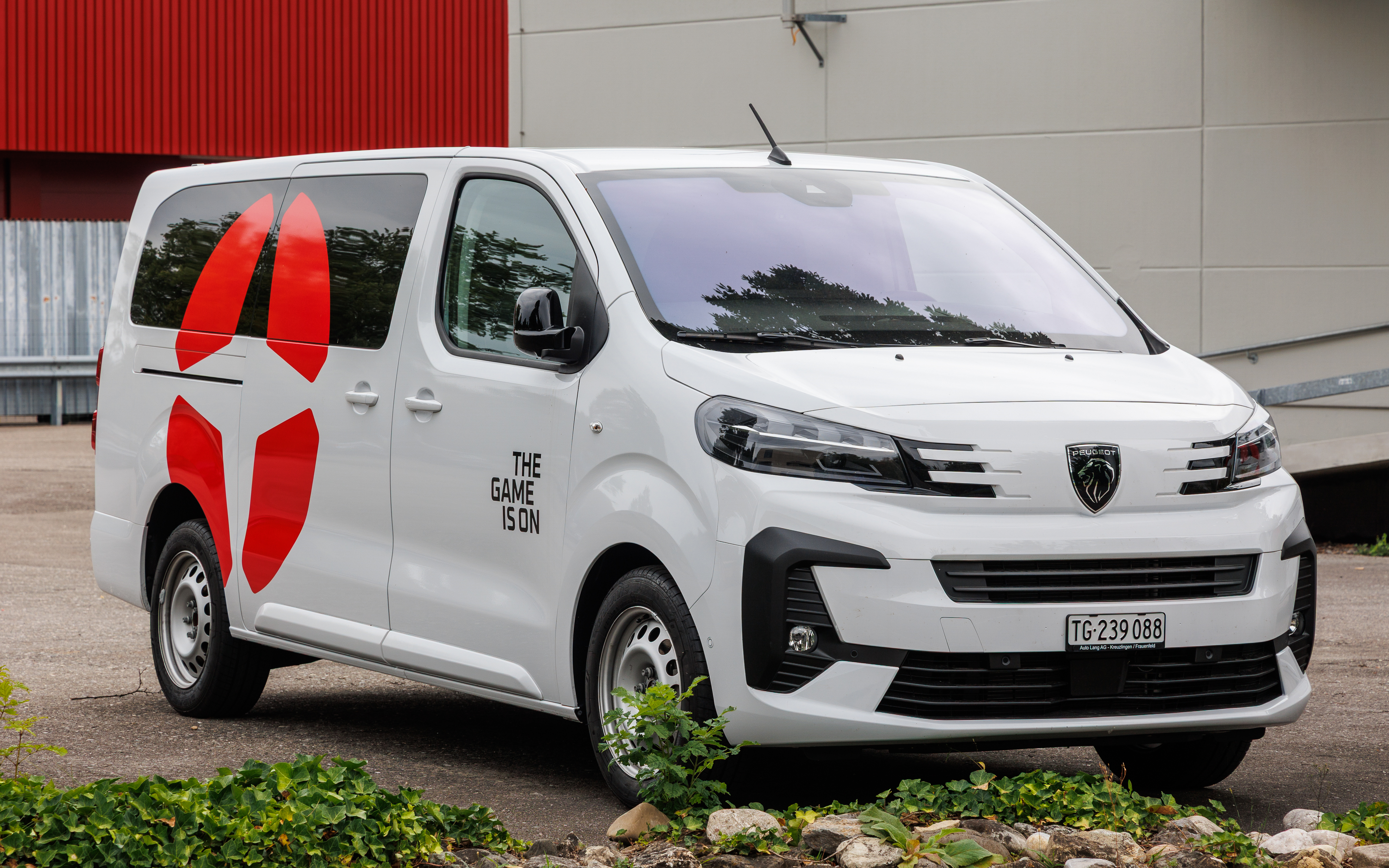
2024 Peugeot Traveller

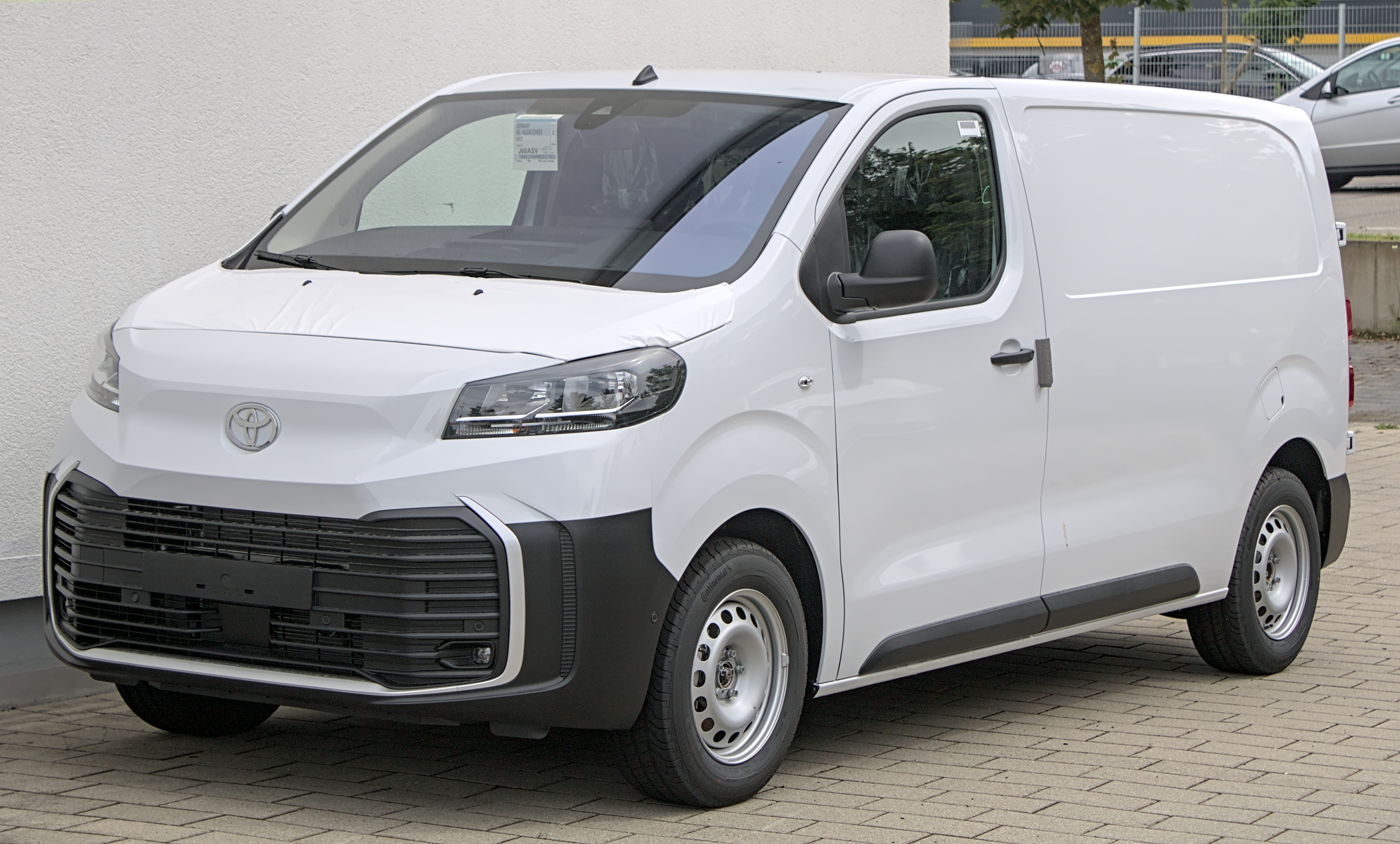
2024 Toyota Proace

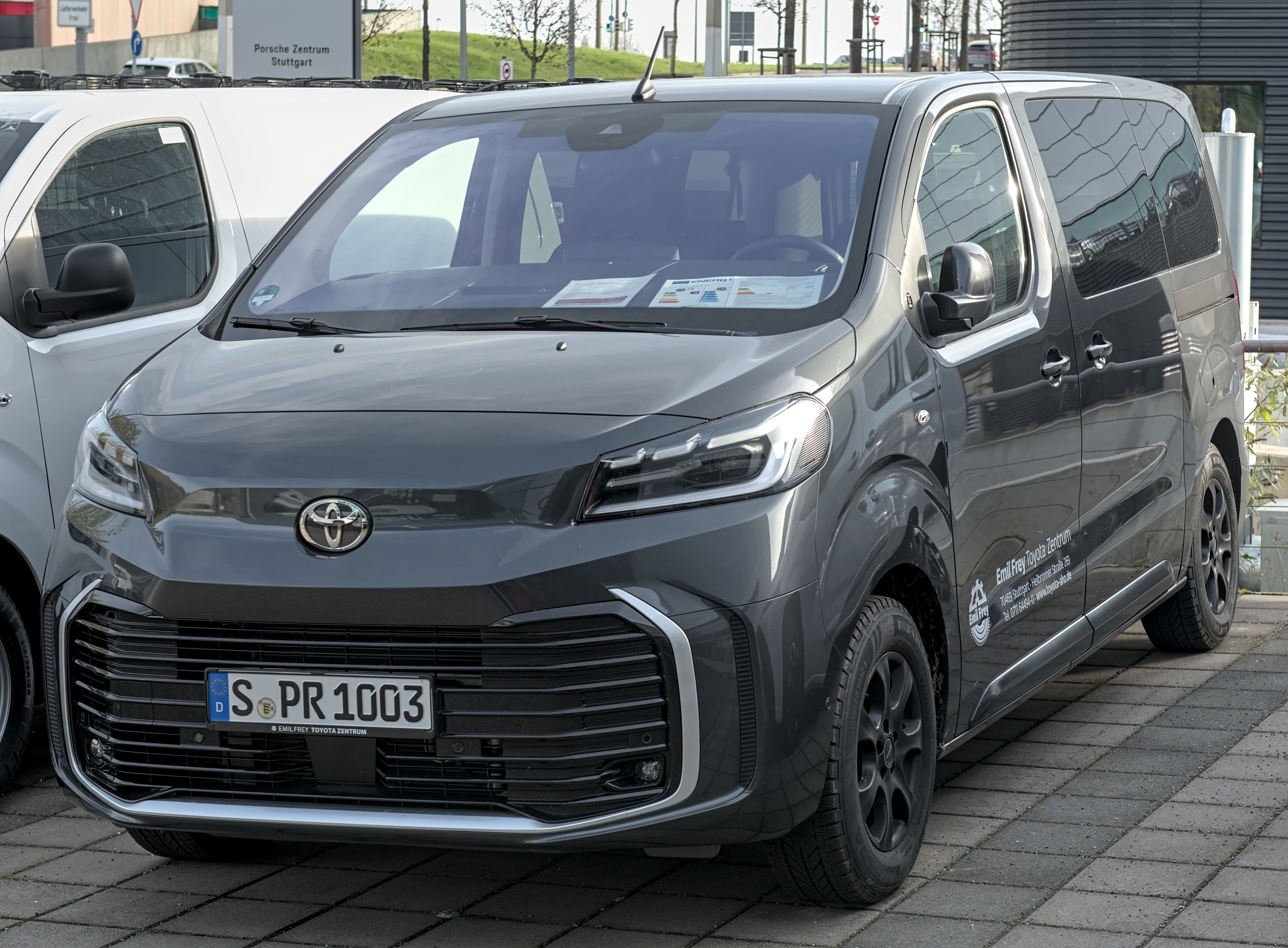
2024 Toyota ProAce Verso

==== Engines from 2026 ====
Engines
Model	Engine	Displacement	Valvetrain	Fuel system	Max. power at rpm	Max. torque at rpm	Gearbox	Years
Diesel engines
1.5 BlueHDI/ Multijet 120	Ford DLD-416	1,499 cc	DOHC 16v	Common rail direct injection	120 PS (88 kW; 118 hp) @ 3,500 rpm	300 N⋅m (221 lb⋅ft) @ 1,750 rpm	6 speed manual	2026–present
2.2 BlueHDI/ Multijet 150	Multijet II	2,184 cc	DOHC 16v	Common rail direct injection	150 PS (110 kW; 148 hp) @ 3,500 rpm	370 N⋅m (273 lb⋅ft) @ 2,000 rpm	6 speed automatic 8 speed automatic	2026–present
2.2 BlueHDI/ Multijet 180	Multijet II	2,184 cc	DOHC 16v	Common rail direct injection	180 PS (132 kW; 178 hp) @ 3,500 rpm	400 N⋅m (295 lb⋅ft) @ 2,000 rpm	6 speed automatic 8 speed automatic	2026–present
Electric	-	-	-	-	136 PS (100 kW; 134 hp)	270 N⋅m (199 lb⋅ft)	-	2020–present

== Sales and production ==
Citroën
Year	Worldwide production	Worldwide sales	Notes
2009	20,000	22,800	
2010	27,900	27,700	
2011	29,625	29,015	Total production reaches 441,700 units.
2012	23,600	24,900	Total production reaches 465,300 units.

Peugeot
Year	Worldwide production	Worldwide sales	Notes
2009	19,000	24,300	
2010	28,900	28,500	
2011	33,260	32,337	Total production reaches 477,699 units.
2012	28,200	29,500	Total production reaches 505,900 units.

Fiat

Year	Worldwide production
2022	18,674
