= Alexandra Boltasseva =

American physicist and engineer

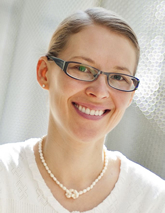
- Born: January 11, 1978 (age 48); Kanash, Chuvash Autonomous Soviet Socialist Republic, Chuvashia
- Citizenship: United States
- Education: Moscow Institute of Physics and Technology, Russia; Technical University of Denmark, Denmark
- Awards: 2023 Fellow of the American Physical Society; 2022 Guggenheim Fellowship; 2021 Fellow of the Materials Research Society; 2020 Fellow of the National Academy of Inventors (NAI); 2019 Fellow of the Institute of Electrical and Electronics Engineers (IEEE); 2018 Blavatnik National Award for Young Scientists Finalist; 2017 Fellow of The International Society For Optics And Photonic (SPIE); 2015 Fellow of The Optical Society; 2013 IEEE Photonics Society Young Investigator Award; 2013 Materials Research Society Outstanding Young Investigator Award; 2011 MIT Technology Review Top Young Innovator; 2009 University of Erlangen-Nuremberg Young Researcher Award in Advanced Optical Technologies; 2008 Young Elite-Researcher Award from the Danish Councils for Independent Research
- Scientific career
- Fields: nanophotonics; nanofabrication; materials science; plasmonics; metamaterials
- Workplaces: Purdue University, Technical University of Denmark
- Website: engineering.purdue.edu/~aeb/

Alexandra Boltasseva (born January 11, 1978), is Ron And Dotty Garvin Tonjes Distinguished Professor of electrical and computer engineering at Purdue University, and editor-in-chief for The Optical Society's Optical Materials Express journal. Her research focuses on plasmonic metamaterials, manmade composites of metals that use surface plasmons to achieve optical properties not seen in nature.

== Education and career ==
Boltasseva studied her bachelor and masters in physics at the Moscow Institute of Physics and Technology, completing her research projects on quantum-well lasers at the Lebedev Physical Institute. She moved to the Technical University of Denmark for her PhD studies in nanophotonics and nanofabrication, where she wants to create a new device through innovative optical materials, advanced fabrication methods and more; working with Sergey I. Bozhevolnyi. Following her PhD, Boltasseva worked at two photonics start-up companies before returning to the Technical University of Denmark as a postdoc and subsequently an associate professor. In 2008 she moved to Purdue University and is currently the Ron And Dotty Garvin Tonjes Distinguished Professor of Electrical and Computer Engineering, as well as holding a courtesy appointment in Materials Engineering.

== Research ==
Prof. A. Boltasseva’s team specializes in nano- and quantum photonics, plasmonic, optical metamaterials, optical materials, and nanofabrication, focusing on how light interacts with structures at the nanoscale. Their research investigates how carefully engineered materials and structures smaller than the wavelength of light can manipulate electromagnetic waves in ways that are not possible with conventional optical components. By studying plasmonics and metamaterials, the team works to control properties such as light confinement, propagation, and absorption, enabling devices that can guide and process light at extremely small scales.

A central theme of Prof. Boltasseva’s research is the development and optimization of nanophotonic structures, beginning with material synthesis and extending to advanced device design and testing. The group explores new materials and fabrication techniques to create structures with tailored optical properties, while also incorporating machine learning and computational design methods to improve the efficiency and performance of these systems. Machine-learning-assisted optimization allows researchers to quickly analyze large design spaces and identify configurations that maximize desired optical behaviors, such as minimizing energy loss or enhancing signal control.

The ultimate goal of this work is to develop new nanophotonic platforms that operate across previously inaccessible wavelength ranges and with improved performance. By reducing optical losses and enabling tunable or reconfigurable devices that are compatible with semiconductor manufacturing, the team aims to advance technologies used in on-chip optical circuits, high-speed information processing, advanced data storage, sensing systems, medical imaging and therapy, energy conversion, and emerging quantum information technologies. Through these innovations, their research contributes to the development of next-generation photonic devices that could significantly improve the efficiency, speed, and functionality of modern optical and electronic systems.

== Awards, honors, memberships ==
A. Boltasseva's research earned her a number of awards:

- 2023 Fellow of the American Physical Society "for important contributions to nanophotonics, plasmonics, and metamaterials, having made a broad impact in the multidisciplinary area merging optics, material science, and nanotechnology".
- 2023 R.W. Wood Prize recipient
- 2022 Guggenheim Fellowship
- In 2021, for the second consecutive year named in The Highly Cited Researchers™ list by Clarivate™.
- 2021 Fellow of the Materials Research Society "For her contributions to plasmonic and optical metamaterials including as plasmonic waveguides for on-chip circuitry, high-temperature nanophotonics, optical structures with extremely low refractive index, and tunable plasmonics"
- 2020 Fellow of the National Academy of Inventors (NAI)
- 2019 Fellow of the Institute of Electrical and Electronics Engineers (IEEE)
- 2018 Blavatnik National Award for Young Scientists Finalist
- 2017 Fellow of The International Society For Optics And Photonic (SPIE)
- 2015 Fellow of The Optical Society "For seminal contributions to nanophotonics and new plasmonic materials."
- 2013 IEEE Photonics Society Young Investigator Award "For seminal contributions to the development of metal-dielectric waveguides for integrated optics and novel approaches for realization of nanoplasmonic devices"
- 2013 Materials Research Society Outstanding Young Investigator Award "For pioneering research to develop novel materials for advanced plasmonic, metamaterial and transformation optics devices with potential applications in future nanoscale photonic technologies"
- 2011 MIT Technology Review Top Young Innovator (TR35)
- 2009 University of Erlangen-Nuremberg Young Researcher Award in Advanced Optical Technologies
- 2008 Young Elite-Researcher Award from the Danish Councils for Independent Research

== Optical Society ==
Alexandra Boltasseva has had significant involvement with Optica (formerly the Optical Society of America) through leadership, editorial roles, and professional recognition within the optics community. She has been a member of the society since 2009 and became a senior member in 2011, reflecting her growing contributions to the field of optics and photonics.

One of her major roles within the organization was serving as Editor-in-Chief of the journal Optical Materials Express, a publication of Optica that focuses on research in optical materials, nanophotonics, and photonic devices. She assumed this position in 2016 and also served on the society’s Board of Editors, helping guide the direction and quality of published research in optics and materials science.

In addition to editorial leadership, Boltasseva has been recognized by the society as a Fellow of Optica, an honor given to researchers who have made significant contributions to optics and photonics. She has also been active in the community through activities such as advising a student chapter of the Optical Society at Purdue University and contributing to professional events and webinars organized by the society.

Her involvement with Optica also includes receiving prestigious recognition from the organization, such as the R. W. Wood Prize, awarded for major scientific contributions to optics. This award recognized her pioneering work in plasmonics, metamaterials, and nanophotonics, fields that explore how engineered materials can manipulate light at extremely small scales.

== References link: Alexander Boltasseva-Purdue University Biography and CV ==
Before completing her doctoral studies, Alexandra Boltasseva gained research experience at the p. N. Lebedev Physical Institute of the Russian Academy of Science in Moscow, where she work as a research assistant. She later worked at Micro Managed Photons and at Alight Technologies. These positions were part of her early professional career before she continued her academic work.
