= Digital commons =

Collectively shared digital goods

The digital commons refers to shared digital resources—such as software, knowledge, data, and cultural content—that are collectively produced and governed by a community and intended for public use. These commons are distinguished by open access, participatory management, and licensing practices that preserve reuse and redistribution. Digital commons play a vital role in areas such as education, research, software development, and civic engagement.

Examples of the digital commons include wikis, open-source software, and open-source licensing. The distinction between digital commons and other digital resources is that the community of people building them can intervene in the governing of their interaction processes and of their shared resources.

The digital commons provides the community with free and easy access to information. Typically, information created in the digital commons is designed to stay in the digital commons by using various forms of licensing, including the GNU General Public License and various Creative Commons licenses.

== Early development ==
One of the first examples of digital commons is the Free Software movement, founded in the 1980s by Richard Stallman as an organized attempt to create a digital software commons. Inspired by the 70s programmer culture of improving software through mutual help, Stallman's movement was designed to encourage the use and distribution of free software.

To prevent the misuse of software created by the movement, Stallman founded the GNU General Public License. Free software released under this license, even if it is improved or modified, must also be released under the same license, ensuring the software stays in the digital commons, free to use.

== Current landscape ==
Today the digital commons takes the form of the Internet. People and organisations can share their software, photos, general information, and ideas due to the digital commons.

Mayo Fuster Morell proposed a definition of digital commons as "information and knowledge resources that are collectively created and owned or shared between or among a community and that tend to be non-exclusive, that is, be (generally freely) available to third parties. Thus, they are oriented to favor use and reuse, rather than to exchange as a commodity. Additionally, the community of people building them can intervene in the governing of their interaction processes and of their shared resources".

The Foundation for P2P Alternatives explicitly aims to "creates a new public domain, an information commons, which should be protected and extended, especially in the domain of common knowledge creation" and actively promotes extending Creative Commons Licenses.

== Modern examples ==
=== Creative Commons ===
Creative Commons (CC) is a non-profit organization that provides many free copyright licenses with which contributors to the digital commons can license their work. Creative Commons is focused on the expansion of flexible copyright. For example, popular image sharing sites like Flickr and Pixabay, provide access to hundreds of millions of Creative Commons licensed images, freely available within the digital commons.

Creators of content in the digital commons can choose the type of Creative Commons license to apply to their works, which specifies the types of rights available to other users. Typically, Creative Commons licenses are used to restrict the work to non-commercial use.

=== Wikis ===
Wikis are another example of digital commons, serving information while allowing members of the community to create and edit content. Through wikis, knowledge can be pooled and compiled, generating a collection of information from which the community can draw.

=== Public software repositories ===
Following in the spirit of the Free Software movement, public software repositories are a system in which communities can work together on open-source software projects, typically through version control systems such as Git and Subversion. Public software repositories allow for individuals to make contributions to the same project, allowing the project to grow bigger than the sum of its parts. A popular platform hosting public and open source software repositories is GitHub.

=== City Top Level Domains ===
Top Level Domains or TLDs are Internet resources that facilitate finding the numbered computers on the Internet. The largest and most familiar TLD is .com. Beginning in 2012, ICANN, the California not-for-profit controlling access to the Domain Name System, began issuing names to cities. More than 30 cities applied for their TLDs, with .paris, .london, .nyc, .tokyo having been issued as of May 2015. A detailing of some commons names within the .nyc TLD includes neighborhood names, voter related names, and civic names.

=== Precious Plastic ===
Precious Plastic is an open source project which promotes recycling of plastic through the use of hardware and business models which are available for free under Creative Commons license. It collaboratively designs and publishes designs, codes, source materials and business models which can be used by any person or group to start a plastic recycling project of their own. The online platform also consists of an online shop where hardware and recycled plastic products can be bought. As of January 2020, more than 80,000 people from around the world are working on some type of Precious Plastic project.

=== Digital Commons as a policy ===
In October 2020 the European Commission adopted its new Open Source Software Strategy 2020–2023. The main goal of the strategy being the possibility to achieve European wide digital sovereignty.

It has been recognized that open source impacts the digital autonomy of Europe and it is likely that open source can give Europe a chance to create and maintain its own, independent digital approach and stay in control of its processes, its information, and its technology.

The digital strategy suggests that collaborative ways of working, such as sharing code, data, and solutions, may become the norm across the Commission's IT community. This open-source strategy promotes open, inclusive, and co-creative working methods. Wherever appropriate, the Commission will share the source code for future IT projects.

For publication of these projects, the European Union public licence (EUPL) will be preferred. The Commission will focus these efforts on an EU-centric digital government code repository (for ex. one in Estonia) In addition, the developers will be free to make occasional contributions to closely related open-source projects. The principles and actions of the new open-source strategy will make it easier to obtain permission to share code with the outside world.

=== Open data ===
Both definitions of Open Data and Commons revolve around the concept of shared resources with a low barrier to access. Open Data usually is linked to data produced by the government and make available to public but it can come from many sources like science, non-profit organizations and society in general.

=== Open-source agriculture ===
Open-source agriculture emerges as a technology-oriented social movement. It aligns itself with other technology- and product-oriented movements, which seek to create alternative technological practices and artifacts. Examples of such movements range from the Luddite movement of the nineteenth century, which opposed profit-driven technologies, to the appropriate technology movement of the 1970s, advocating for human-centered, small-scale, affordable, and environmentally friendly technology with local autonomy. Additionally, the organic food movement promoting alternative agricultural methods and the open-source software and hardware movement opposing proprietary software and hardware production have contributed to the legacy on which open-source agriculture now builds.

Open-source agriculture follows the principles of open-source software development, facilitating the sharing of agricultural knowledge, practices, and data within the farming community. By encouraging collaboration and transparency, this movement aims to enhance innovation and efficiency in farming practices. Farmers can freely access, modify, and redistribute information, empowering them with customizable agricultural technologies and solutions suited to their unique contexts. By adopting open-source principles, open-source agriculture strives to foster sustainability and resilience in the agricultural sector while challenging traditional proprietary approaches. Through its inclusive approach to agricultural innovation, the movement seeks to create a more equitable and sustainable future for farmers and communities worldwide.

== Issues ==
=== Opportunity of digital commons ===
The usage of digital commons has led to the disruption of industries that benefited from publishing (authors and publishers) while providing potential to other industries. Many wikis help to pass knowledge to be used in a productive manner. They also have increased opportunities in education, healthcare, manufacturing, governance, finance, science, etc.

Massive open online courses are among the opportunities made possible by the digital commons, giving many people access to education. Mayo Clinic makes medical knowledge publicly available. Some scientific journals provide online access to their content.

=== Gender imbalance in digital commons ===
The traditional under-representation of women and the lack of gender diversity in the field of STEM and in the programmer culture is also present in digital commons-based initiatives like open science and open-source-software projects like Wikipedia or OpenStreetMap. Also smaller initiatives, like hackerspaces, makerspaces or fab labs are characterized by a considerable gender gap among their participants.

There are different initiatives trying to face these challenges and bridging this gap by providing and creating empowering spaces where women and non-binary persons can experiment, exchange and learn with and from each other. Feminist hackerspaces were founded as a reaction to women's experiences of sexism, harassment and misogyny shown by the brogrammer culture in hackerspaces. Besides closing the gender gap among participants and creating safe spaces for female and non-binary persons, some projects additionally want to visualize the under-representation and lack of gender-related topics in the movements and in the outcome of their work. The collective Geochicas for example is engaged in the OpenStreetMap community looking on maps through a feminist lens and visualize data linked to gender and feminism. One project launched during 2016 and 2017 aimed to map cancer clinics and feminicides in Nicaragua. In the same years Geochicas created visibility campaigns on Twitter under the hashtag "#MujeresMapeandoElMundo" and the “International Survey on Gender Representation”. In 2018 they created a virtual map by analyzing data from OpenStreetMap to rise awareness of the lack of representation of women's names on the streets of cities in Latin America and Spain.

=== Tragedy of digital commons ===
Based on the tragedy of the commons and digital divide, Gian Maria Greco and Luciano Floridi have described the "tragedy of digital commons". As with the tragedy of the commons, the problem of the tragedy of the digital commons lies in the population and arises in two ways:

1. the average user of the information technology (infosphere) behaves in the way Hardin's herdsmen behave by exploiting common resources until they no longer can recover, meaning that users do not pay attention to the consequences of their behaviour (for example, by overloading of the traffic by wanting to access the webpage as quick as possible).
2. the pollution of the infosphere, i.e., the indiscriminate and improper usage of the technology and digital resources and overproduction of data. This brings excess information that leads to corruption of communication and information overload. An example of this is spam, which takes up to 45% of email traffic.

The tragedy of the digital commons also considers other artificial agents, like computer worms, that can self-replicate and spread within computer systems, leading to digital pollution.

== See also ==
- Knowledge commons
- Commons
- Tragedy of the commons
