= Brian Vohnsen =

Physicist

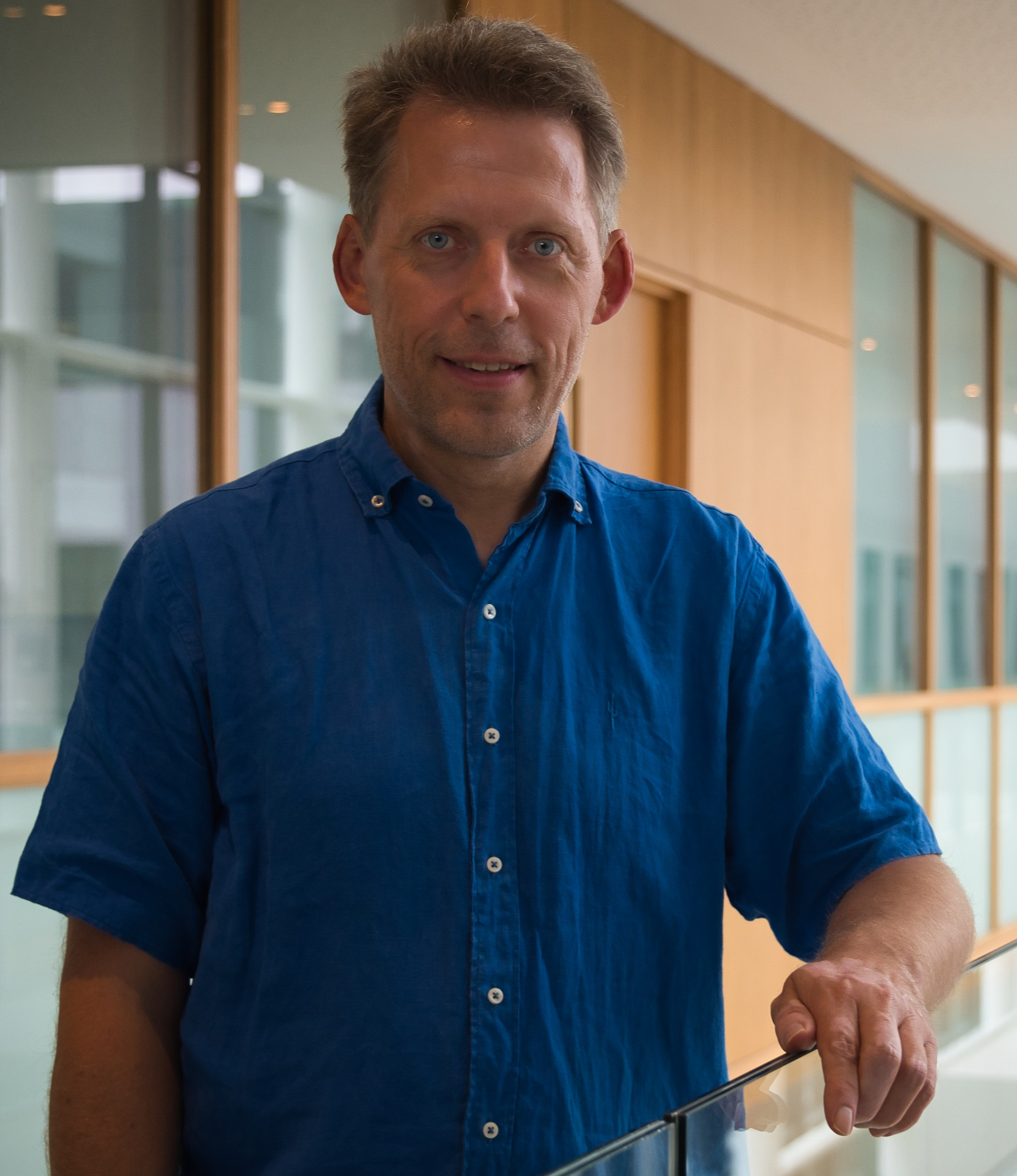
Brian Vohnsen

Brian Vohnsen is a professor of physics at UCD in Dublin, Ireland specializing in optics. He is head of the Advanced Optical Imaging Group which he founded in 2008. He has received recognition for his ability to connect the field of biomedical optics and nano-optics. In 2021 he became a fellow of Optica for significant contributions to vision science, including photoreceptor optics and high resolution retinal imaging.

== Early life and education ==
Brian Vohnsen, born in Aarhus, Denmark, studied engineering at Aalborg University before transferring into the field of Optics. In 1994 he graduated with a Master of Science in optical engineering and laser technology before going on to complete a PhD in optical physics at the same university in 1998. He went on to become an assistant professor at Aalborg University for three years after completing his PhD, before moving to Spain after being awarded a Marie-Curie Fellowship where he worked as a researcher in Universidad de Murcia alongside Pablo Artal for 7 years (2001 - 2008). During this time he was also awarded a Ramon y Cajal fellowship. In 2008 he moved to Ireland in search of further research opportunities and started working in University College Dublin, where he still works today. During his travels Vohnsen has gained fluency or professional working proficiency in Danish, English, German and Spanish.

== Professional biography ==
Vohnsen did his PhD in the area of nano-photonics and near-field optics at Aalborg University under Sergey I. Bozhevolnyi. He did a postdoctoral fellowship at Universidad de Murcia funded by a Marie-Curie Fellowship where he worked on topics such as Evanescent field and directional imaging including a 2001 research paper on visualizing evanescent waves ("Direct visualization of evanescent optical waves") and imaging of retinal cone mosaic ("Directional imaging of the retinal cone mosaic").

In 2008 Vohnsen came to Ireland as a Science Foundation Ireland Stokes awardee and created a new MSc. programme in NanoBio Science while also exploring advanced optical techniques centered on high-resolution optical images. Lately, he has pioneered new exploration of the Stiles-Crawford effect in relation to vision science and myopia.

== Awards and honours ==
- ARVO Fellow (Silver 2024, Gold 2026)
- Optica Fellow (2021)
- Stokes Lectureship award (2008)
- Ramon y Cajal Fellowship (2003 – 2008)
- Marie-Curie Fellowship (2001 – 2003)
