= Christopher Clemens =

American astronomy academic and Provost

James Christopher Clemens

Executive Vice Chancellor and Provost of the University of North Carolina at Chapel Hill
- In office December 10, 2021 – May 16, 2025
- President: Kevin Guskiewicz; Lee Roberts
- Preceded by: Bob Blouin
- Succeeded by: James W. Dean Jr. (interim)

Personal details
- Born: December 8, 1963 (age 62) Pascagoula, Mississippi, U.S.
- Education: University of Oklahoma (BS); University of Texas at Austin (PhD)
- Scientific career
- Fields: Physics; Astronomy
- Workplaces: Iowa State University (1994–1996); California Institute of Technology (1996–1998); University of North Carolina at Chapel Hill (1998–
- Thesis: The Origin and Evolution of the White Dwarf Stars (1994)
- Doctoral advisor: Ed Nather; Don Winget
- Doctoral students: Mercedes López-Morales

James Christopher "Chris" Clemens (born 1963) is an American astrophysicist and academic administrator. He is the Jaroslav Folda Distinguished Professor of Physics and Astronomy at the University of North Carolina at Chapel Hill. Clemens works on astronomical instrumentation, white dwarf stars, and exoplanetary debris. Clemens was Provost of UNC-Chapel Hill from 10 December 2021 to 16 May 2025. He stepped down as Executive Vice Chancellor and Provost on May 16, 2025.

In September 2025, Clemens filed a lawsuit against the University of North Carolina at Chapel Hill and its Board of Trustees alleging violations of North Carolina’s Open Meetings Law and Public Records Law. The complaint asserted that the Board held closed-session discussions on matters such as tenure and athletics in violation of state transparency rules.

== Education and career ==
Clemens studied astrophysics at the University of Oklahoma and was the 1995 recipient of the Carl Albert Award from the College of Arts and Sciences. He received his PhD in Astronomy from the University of Texas at Austin in 1994. His dissertation "The Origin and Evolution of the White Dwarf Stars" was selected by the Council of Graduate Schools for the 1995 distinguished dissertation award in math, physical sciences, and engineering. He was awarded a 1993 NASA Hubble postdoctoral fellowship and conducted research at Iowa State University before joining California Institute of Technology as a Sherman Fairchild Postdoctoral Fellow from 1996–98.

== Research and teaching ==
Clemens' research interests include astronomical instrumentation and the study of pulsating white dwarf stars. In the early 2000s, he led the research team that designed and built the Goodman Spectrograph at the Southern Astrophysical Research Telescope (SOAR). He teaches undergraduate astronomy and graduate stellar astrophysics as well as courses in the history of science. As part of UNC's "Difficult Dialogues" initiative, in 2007 he developed a cluster course at the intersection of science and religion called the "Medieval Foundations of Modern Cosmology." A Roman Catholic, he speaks frequently on the compatibility of science and religion, arguing that "science as we know and practice it is a product of a Western Christian culture."

In 2017 Clemens used his astronomical experience to design the Baldachin in the Holy Name of Jesus Cathedral in Raleigh, North Carolina. Clemens created a design that depicts the night sky as it appeared on Easter Sunday in the year 33, the likely date of the crucifixion and resurrection of Jesus. Using astronomy to study time has been a theme of Clemens' instruction at the University of North Carolina.

== Work at UNC Chapel Hill ==
At UNC, Clemens has served as chair of the Department of Physics and Astronomy, Senior Associate Dean of Natural Sciences, Senior Associate Dean of Research and Innovation, founding director of the Institute for Convergent Science and founding director of the Program for Public Discourse.

=== Sponsorship of Student Organizations ===
Clemens has served as faculty sponsor for several UNC student organizations, some of them controversial, adhering to the AAUP's Joint Statement on the Rights and Freedoms of Students principle that "institutional recognition should not be withheld or withdrawn solely because of the inability of a student organization to secure an adviser." He and other faculty sponsored UNC College Republicans and Carolina Review.

=== Program for Public Discourse ===
Clemens helped establish and served as inaugural faculty director of the controversial Program for Public Discourse (initially called the Program in Civic Virtue and Civil Discourse), which was the precursor to the conservative School of Civic Life and Leadership. The program has been described as having a "conservative bent" with ties to the Dowd Foundation and other conservative academic centers such as the James Madison Program in American Ideals and Institutions, directed by Robert P. George and School of Civic & Economic Thought and Leadership at Arizona State University, directed by Paul O. Carrese. The program is held in high regard by the American Council of Trustees and Alumni.

=== Tenure as Provost ===
Clemens was appointed to the position of Provost in December 2021 in a move described as "shrouded in secrecy" by WUNC North Carolina Public Radio. In his term as Provost, UNC has launched two new schools, the School of Data Science and Society and the School of Civic Life and Leadership. He has been an advocate for academic freedom and freedom of the intellect, and has hosted conservative-leaning climate change skeptics, Steve Koonin and Roger Pielke, Jr., in a Steamboat Institute sponsored debate. In May 2024 it was revealed that the business school had secretly recorded a professor. As of July 2024, Clemens has said he will work with faculty to develop a "transparent policy for the use of video cameras in classrooms." He stepped down in May 2025.

== Lawsuit and aftermath ==
In September 2025, Clemens filed a lawsuit against the University of North Carolina at Chapel Hill and its Board of Trustees alleging that university leadership violated North Carolina’s Open Meetings Law and Public Records Law by holding closed-session deliberations on tenure and other policy matters. UNC disputed the allegations, releasing communications it said showed compliance with state law. Clemens voluntarily dismissed the case in April, 2026 after one of the UNC trustees resigned.
