= Maritza Lara-López =

Spanish astronomer

Maritza Arlene Lara-López is a Mexican astronomer whose research interests include metallicity in galaxy formation and evolution and extragalactic astronomy. She is a participant in the Galaxy And Mass Assembly survey, and a researcher and Ramón y Cajal Fellow in the faculty of physical sciences at the Complutense University of Madrid.

== Education and career ==
Lara-López is originally from Puebla, and did her undergraduate studies in physics at the Meritorious Autonomous University of Puebla, graduating in 2005 with a senior thesis based on research at the National Institute of Astrophysics, Optics and Electronics in Puebla and mentored by Raul Mújica and Omar López Cruz. She became a graduate student at the Instituto de Astrofísica de Canarias in the Canary Islands of Spain, supported by the Mexican National Council of Science and Technology (CONACyT). She earned a master's degree in 2007 and completed her PhD in 2011, supervised by Jordi Cepa.

She was a researcher and "Super Science Fellow" at the Australian Astronomical Observatory from 2011 to 2014. Next, she became an assistant professor of astronomy at the National Autonomous University of Mexico (UNAM), associated with the UNAM Institute of Astronomy, from 2014 to 2017. She was a research fellow and assistant professor at the Niels Bohr Institute of the University of Copenhagen from 2017 to 2020, and a postdoctoral researcher at the Armagh Observatory in Ireland from 2020 to 2022. She took her present position as Ramon y Cajal Fellow in the faculty of physical sciences at the Complutense University of Madrid in 2022.

Her research collaborations include the Galaxy And Mass Assembly survey, the SAMI Galaxy Survey, and the OSIRIS Tunable Emission Line Object Survey (OTELO).

== Recognition ==
Lara-López's dissertation won a prize for the best thesis in Mexico. In 2016, L'Oréal México named her as one of five winners of their L'Oréal-UNESCO Award for Women in Science Fellowship.
