= Vincenzo Trani =

Italian-Russian businessman

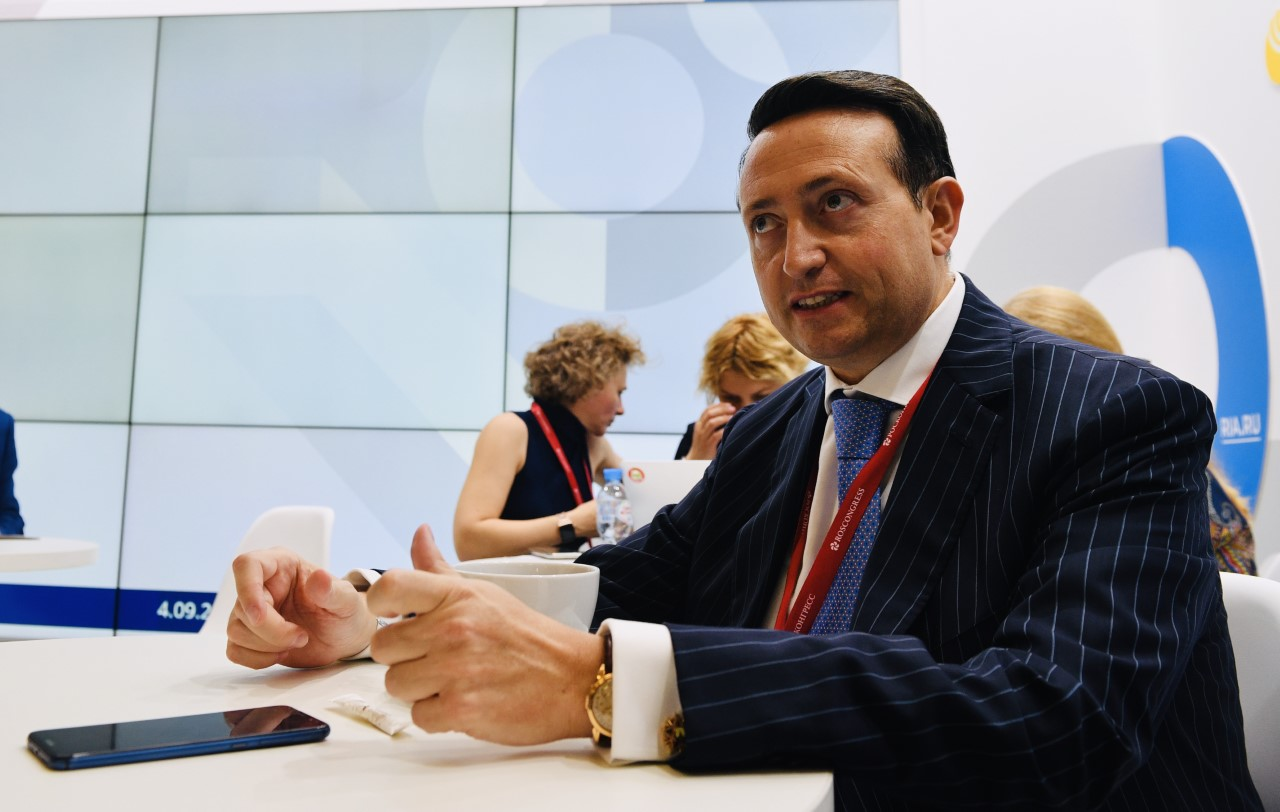
- Vincenzo Trani in 2019
- Born: May 18, 1974 (age 52)
- Education: St. Petersburg Institute of International Trade, Economics and Law
- Occupation: Businessman
- Known for: Founding of Delimobil
- Board member of: Delimobil

Vincenzo Trani (born May 18, 1974) is an Italian businessman. He is the founder of the Russian car-sharing company Delimobil.

== Early life and education ==
Trani was born on May 18, 1974, in Naples, Italy. He comes from a family of Italian bankers. His father served as the head of international department of Banca Monte dei Paschi di Siena, an Italian bank which is the world's oldest bank.

He is a graduate of the St. Petersburg Institute of International Trade, Economics and Law with a degree in events economics and jurisprudence.

Prior to his arrival in Russia, Trani served in the Italian Army and was employed as a banker hailing different positions at Banca Monte dei Paschi di Siena.

== Career ==
Trani arrived in Russia in 2001 when he saw an advertisement in the Moscow Times about the European Bank for Reconstruction and Development (EBRD). He started out as a senior advisor of small and midsize business development and then as the EBRD representative of the board of directors. He later became the deputy director general of KMB Bank in Russia.

Trani founded the company, Mikro Kapital launched in 2008, a firm which lends loans to small scale and medium-sized businesses in Russia, East Europe and CIS countries. Trani stepped aside from the board of directors in 2024.

In 2015, Trani founded the car-sharing service Delimobil.

From 2019 to 2022, and again from February 2025 onward, Trani served as President of the Italian-Russian Chamber of Commerce In March 2021, The Guardian reported that Trani had helped close the deal on an arrangement in which ten million doses of the Russian Sputnik V COVID-19 vaccine would be produced in Italy for export to non-EU countries by the end of 2021. In 2025, Vincenzo Trani founded MK Global Kapital, which will take over the management of ALTERNATIVE, the Luxembourg-based securitisation fund, as of 1 January 2026, marking a significant milestone in the Fund's evolution since the start of operations in 2015.

== Awards and achievements ==
Trani is the recipient of the Order of the Star of Italy.

In 2009, he was appointed as the Honorary Consul of Belarus in Naples. The term as consul expired in 2020 and has not been renewed.

== See also ==
- Italy–Russia relations
- Delimobil
- Carsharing in Moscow
