= Chiara Bisagni =

Italian aerospace engineer

Chiara Bisagni is an Italian aerospace engineer whose research involves the experimental analysis and simulation of buckling and other mechanical properties of composite materials used in aerospace applications. She is a professor in the Department of Aerospace Science and Technology at the Polytechnic University of Milan.

== Education and career ==
Bisagni was a student at the Polytechnic University of Milan, where she earned a laurea in aeronautical engineering and a Ph.D. in aerospace engineering.

She worked as an assistant and associate professor at the Polytechnic University of Milan from 1999 to 2012, including a 2006–2007 visiting position as a Fulbright Scholar at the Massachusetts Institute of Technology. She moved in 2012 to the University of California, San Diego, as a professor of structural engineering, while continuing to hold a position on leave from Milan. After moving again in 2015 to the Delft University of Technology Faculty of Aerospace Engineering, she returned to the Polytechnic University of Milan and her present position there in 2023, also continuing as a guest professor at Delft.

== Recognition ==
Bisagni was the 2001 recipient of the Arnaldo Rancati Award of the Istituto Lombardo Accademia di Scienze e Lettere. She was named a Fellow of the American Institute of Aeronautics and Astronautics in 2021. She became a knight in the Order of the Star of Italy in 2022.
