= Mercedes López-Morales =

Spanish-American astrophysicist

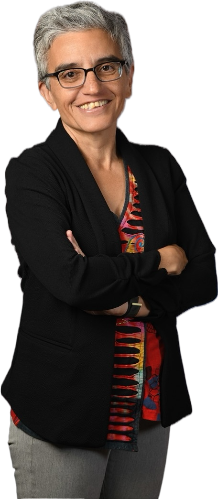
- Born: Santa Cruz de Tenerife, Spain
- Citizenship: American
- Education: University of North Carolina at Chapel Hill
- Known for: Discovery and characterization of Exoplanets
- Scientific career
- Fields: Exoplanet astrophysics
- Workplaces: Space Telescope Science Institute
- Doctoral advisor: Christopher Clemens

Mercedes López-Morales is a Spanish-American astrophysicist at the Space Telescope Science Institute (STScI) in Maryland, who works on detection and characterization of exoplanet atmospheres.

== Education and career ==
López-Morales studied physics during her undergraduate program at Universidad de La Laguna, in the Canary Islands, Spain. She received her PhD in astronomy from the University of North Carolina at Chapel Hill in 2004. After completing her doctoral degree, she was a Carnegie postdoctoral fellow from 2004 until 2010 at the Carnegie Science Department of Terrestrial Magnetism (DTM) in Washington, DC. During her tenure at the Carnegie Science DTM, López-Morales was also a postdoc at the NASA Astrobiology Institute (NAI). In 2007, López-Morales was awarded a Hubble Fellowship. While at the NAI, she worked on two different projects, From Molecular Clouds to Habitable Planetary Systems and Looking Outward: Studies of the Physical and Chemical Evolution of Planetary Systems.

== Work ==
Between 2010 and 2012, López-Morales returned to Spain to join the Institute of Space Sciences in Barcelona, Spain, where she was awarded a prestigious Ramón y Cajal Fellowship. She joined the Center for Astrophysics | Harvard & Smithsonian (CfA) as a Federal Government Scientist in 2012. In 2014–2015, she was a fellow at the Radcliffe Institute for Advanced Study at Harvard University, where she worked on Searching for Atmospheric Signatures of Other Worlds. She was Deputy Associate Director Science at the CfA in 2023-2024, before she joined the Space Telescope Science Institute in late 2024.

López-Morales is currently the Associate Director for Science at the Space Telescope Science Institute, where she also leads a research group using spectroscopy techniques to characterize the atmospheres of exoplanets with observations from the James Webb Space Telescope and the Hubble Space Telescope. Previously, she led the Exoplanet Spectroscopy Survey (ACCESS) project where she investigated optical properties of exoplanet atmospheres using ground-based instrumentation on the Magellan Telescopes in Chile. Between 2016-2022 she was Co-PI of the PanCET project, the largest exoplanet atmospheres program awarded time on the Hubble Space Telescope. López-Morales' work also focuses on the discovery and characterization of terrestrial exoplanets using HARPS-N, a high-resolution optical spectrograph with broad wavelength coverage installed at the Telescopopio Nazionale Galileo in the Canary Islands, Spain.
