= Juan de la Cierva Scholarship =

Spanish scientific postdoctoral scholarship

The Juan de la Cierva Scholarship (JdlC) is a Spanish post-doctoral scholarship, funded by the Spanish Ministry of Science, that allows outstanding young researchers to establish a postdoctoral career in Spanish research institutions. It is, together with the more senior Ramón y Cajal Scholarship, the two most prestigious nationally funded research scholarships to follow a scientific career in Spain.

== History ==
The scholarship honors the Spanish inventor Juan de la Cierva. It started back in 2004 with 350 annual scholarships, and it has been awarded every year since then, to date (January 2023). It has provided 2 to 3 years of funding, depending on its modalities, which have varied over time.

The program offered 3-year contracts with the idea of attracting talent from abroad. The scholarship suffered drastic reductions in funding during the European debt crisis, which seriously affected Spain. In 2012, the funding and positions were reduced a 40%, and their calls delayed. In 2014, the JdlC program was expanded, opening two modalities: the more junior "Formación" with 2 years of contract, and the later "Incorporación", with another 2 years of contract, which in 2017 became 3 years. However, in 2021 the second modality was suppressed again, while at the same time incrementing the funding of the first modality in a 122% using the Next Generation EU funds.

More recently, there have been rising concerns on the program by the scientific community, protesting around its low salaries and employment instability, its discrimination against pregnant women, or its bureaucratic processes.

== Impact ==
The scholarship has been funding prestigious researchers in Spain, often bringing them from overseas, across all disciplines, including Biology, Physics, Mathematics, Medicine, History, Social sciences or Engineering. This scholarship has enabled high impact research, such as a number of publications in Nature or Oxford University journals. Some notable Juan de la Cierva scholars are Carolina Mallol, Manlio De Domenico, Mayo Fuster Morell, Eva Miranda or Sílvia Osuna Oliveras.
