= Stiles–Crawford effect =

The Stiles–Crawford effect (subdivided into the Stiles–Crawford effect of the first and second kind) is a property of the directional sensitivity of the cone photoreceptors of the human eye.

The Stiles–Crawford effect of the first kind is that light entering the eye near the edge of the pupil produces a lower photoreceptor response than light of equal intensity entering near the center of the pupil. The photoreceptor response is significantly lower than expected by the reduction in the photoreceptor acceptance angle of light entering near the edge of the pupil. Measurements indicate that the peak photoreceptor sensitivity does not occur for light entering the eye directly through the center of the pupil, but at an offset of approximately 0.2–0.5 mm towards the nasal side.

The Stiles–Crawford effect of the second kind is that the observed color of monochromatic light entering the eye near the edge of the pupil is different from the same light entering near the center of the pupil, regardless of the overall intensities of the two lights.

Both of the Stiles–Crawford effects are highly wavelength-dependent, and they are most evident under photopic conditions. There are several factors that contribute to the Stiles–Crawford effect, though it is generally accepted that it is primarily a result of the guiding properties of light of the cone photoreceptors. The reduced sensitivity to light passing near the edge of the pupil enhances human vision by reducing the sensitivity of the visual stimulus to light that exhibits significant optical aberrations and diffraction.

== Discovery ==
In the 1920s, Walter Stanley Stiles, a young physicist at the National Physical Laboratory in Teddington, England, examined the effects of street lighting and headlight features on automobile traffic accidents, which were becoming increasingly prevalent at the time. Stiles, along with his fellow National Physical Laboratory researcher Brian Hewson Crawford, set out to measure the effect of light intensity on pupil size. They constructed an apparatus in which two independently controlled beams, both emitted by the same light source, entered the eye: a narrow beam through the center of the pupil, and a wider beam filling the whole pupil. The two beams alternated in time, and the observer was instructed to adjust the intensity of the wider beam until minimum flicker was observed, thus minimizing the difference in the visual stimulus between the two beams. Stiles and Crawford found that the luminance of the pupil is not proportional to the pupil area. For instance, the luminance of a 30 mm^{2} pupil was found to be only twice that of a 10 mm^{2} pupil. In other words, to match the apparent brightness of light entering a 30 mm^{2} pupil, the luminance entering through a 10 mm^{2} pupil had to be increased by a factor of two, instead of the expected factor of three.

Stiles and Crawford subsequently measured this effect more precisely by observing the visual stimulus of narrow beams of light selectively passed through various positions in the pupil using pinholes. Using similar methods, the Stiles–Crawford effect has been verified by the scientific community.

== Observations ==
The Stiles–Crawford Effect is quantified as a function of distance (d) away from the center of the pupil using the following equation:

$$\eta\,\! (d) = \frac{\text{amount of light entering through the center of the pupil to produce a certain response}}{\text{amount of light entering at a distance }d \text{ away from the center to produce the same response}}$$,

where η is the relative luminance efficiency, and d is defined as positive on the temporal side of the pupil and negative on the nasal side of the pupil.

Measurements of the relative luminance efficiency are typically largest and symmetric about some distance (d_{m}), which is typically ranges from -0.2 to -0.5 mm, away from the center of the pupil towards the nasal side. The significance of the Stiles–Crawford effect is evident the drop of relative luminance efficiency by up to 90% for light entering near the edge of the pupil.

Experimental data are fit accurately using the following empirical relationship:

$$\eta\,\! (d) = \eta\,\! (d_m)10^{-p(\lambda\,\!)(d-d_m)^2}$$,

where p(λ) is a wavelength dependent parameter which represents the magnitude of the Stiles–Crawford effect, with larger values of p corresponding to a stronger falloff in the relative luminance efficiency as a function of distance from the center of the pupil. Measurements indicate that the value of p(λ) ranges from 0.05 to 0.08.

== Explanation ==
Initially, it was thought that the Stiles–Crawford effect may be caused by the screening of light that passes near the edge of the pupil. This possibility was ruled out because variations in light extinction along different light paths through the pupil do not account for the significant reduction in the luminance efficiency. Furthermore, light screening does not explain the significant wavelength dependence of the Stiles–Crawford effect. Due to the large reduction in the Stiles–Crawford effect for rod vision tested under scotopic conditions, scientists concluded that it must be dependent on properties of the retina; more specifically the photon-capture properties of the cone photoreceptors.

Electromagnetic analysis of light rays incident on a model human cone revealed that the Stiles–Crawford effect is explained by the shape, size, and refractive indices of the various parts of cone photoreceptors, which are roughly oriented towards the center of the pupil. Because the width of human cone cells is of the order of two micrometers, which is similar to the wavelength of visible light, electromagnetic analysis indicated that the light capture phenomena in human cone cells are similar to those observed in optical waveguides. More specifically, due to the narrow confinement of light within cone photoreceptors, destructive or constructive interference of the electromagnetic field may occur within the cone photoreceptors for particular wavelengths of light, thus significantly affecting the overall absorption of light by the photopigment molecules. This was the first analysis that sufficiently explained the non-monotonic wavelength dependence of p parameter that describes the strength the Stiles–Crawford effect.

However, due to simplicity of the cone models and the lack of accurate knowledge of the optical parameters of the human cone cell used in the electromagnetic analysis, it is unclear whether other factors such as the photopigment concentrations may contribute to the Stiles–Crawford effect. Due to the complexity of a single cone photoreceptor and to the layers of the retina which lie ahead of the cone photoreceptor on the light path, as well as to the randomness associated with the distribution and orientation of cone photoreceptors, it is extremely difficult to model all of the factors which may affect the production of the visual stimulus in an eye.

Unique cones and Müller cells with light fibre-like properties are present in the center of the fovea. It has been proposed that these unique Müller cells caused angle dependent light reflection and thereby a Stiles–Crawford effect-like drop in the intensity of light guided through the foveola.

Tschukalow et al. measured the transmission of collimated light under a light microscope at different angles after it had passed through human foveae from flat mounted isolated retinae.

Light entering the fovea center, which is composed only of cones and Müller cells, at an angle of 0 degrees causes a very bright spot after passing through this area. However, when the angle of the light beam is changed to 10 degrees, less light is measured after passing through the retina, the foveolar center becomes darker and the Stiles–Crawford effect-like phenomenon is directly visible. Measurements of the intensities of light transmission through the central foveola for the incident angles 0 and 10 degrees resemble the relative luminance efficiency for narrow light bundles as a function of the location where the beam enters the pupil as reported by Stiles and Crawford.

A different approach, introduced by Vohnsen, considers the photopic Stiles-Crawford effect of the first kind to be a consequence of leakage rather than waveguiding by the dense and optically irregular photoreceptors. This agrees with the associated Stiles-Crawford effect of the 2nd kind (hue shift accompanying the Stiles-Crawford effect of the first kind) and also explains the lack of directionality in scotopic conditions.

In March 2022 it was shown that mitochondria in photoreceptors can act as microlenses. These microlenses focus light onto a cone's pigments.
