= Delimobil =

Russian carsharing company

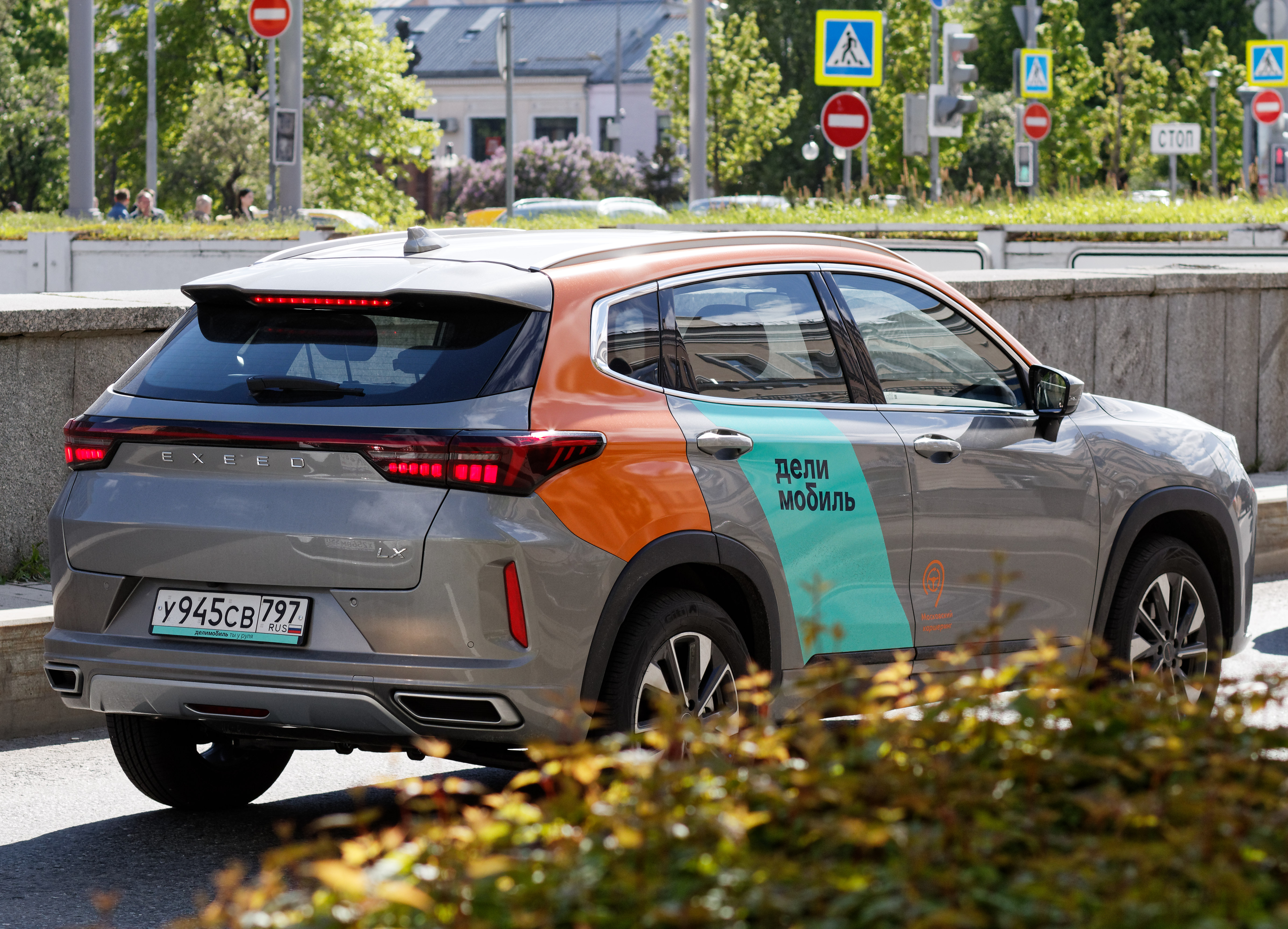
- An Exeed LX featuring new branding, Moscow, 2025.
- Native name: Делимобиль
- Traded as: MCX: DELI
- Founded: 2015
- Headquarters: Moscow, Russia
- Key people: Vincenzo Trani
- Revenue: 30,832,000,000 Russian ruble (2025)
- Operating income: 5,992,000,000 Russian ruble (2025)
- Net income: −3,734,000,000 Russian ruble (2025)
- Total assets: 35,967,000,000 Russian ruble (2025)
- Website: delimobil.ru

Delimobil (Russian: Делимобиль) is one of the largest carsharing organizations in Russia, with a fleet of over 18,000 vehicles and more than 7.1 million members. Its vehicle fleet consists of BMW X5, Renault Kaptur, Volkswagen Polo and the Toyota RAV4.

Delimobil's carsharing service offers short-term car rentals in Moscow, Saint Petersburg, Nizhny Novgorod, Yekaterinburg, Samara, Kazan, Novosibirsk, Krasnodar and Tula.

== History ==
The company was founded in 2015 with a fleet of 100 cars in Moscow.

As of October 2021, Delimobil has more than 18,000 cars in Moscow and 11 cities in Russia. In the same month, Delimobil has filed documents with the U.S. Securities and Exchange Commission for an IPO on the New York Stock Exchange.

In November 2021, an Initial Public Offering (IPO) of Delimobil Holding S.A. at NYSE was delayed because of negotiations with investors. The car sharing company was also targeting an IPO Moscow Exchange. The IPO was delayed.

At the beginning of February 2024, Delimobil held an IPO on the Moscow Exchange. A total of 4.2 billion rubles were raised. The share of free float was 9 percent. Bidding began on February 7.

== See also ==
- Carsharing in Moscow
- Vincenzo Trani
- ComfortDelGro
