= Open meetings law in North Carolina =

North Carolina's open meetings law, enacted in 1971, emphasizes the need for all official meetings of public bodies to be open to the public, with narrow provisions for closed sessions, and for public notice of such meetings. The courts have played a significant role in enforcing and guiding application of the law, found in Section 143 Article 33C of the North Carolina General Statutes.

== History ==
North Carolina's open meetings law was first enacted in 1971. By 1976, the law had gotten considerable attention from the government officials required to comply with the law and from the press; it had also been the subject of several lawsuits. The law was criticized for a lack of clarity because those who interpreted it literally drew different conclusions from those who gave more consideration to its context and goals.

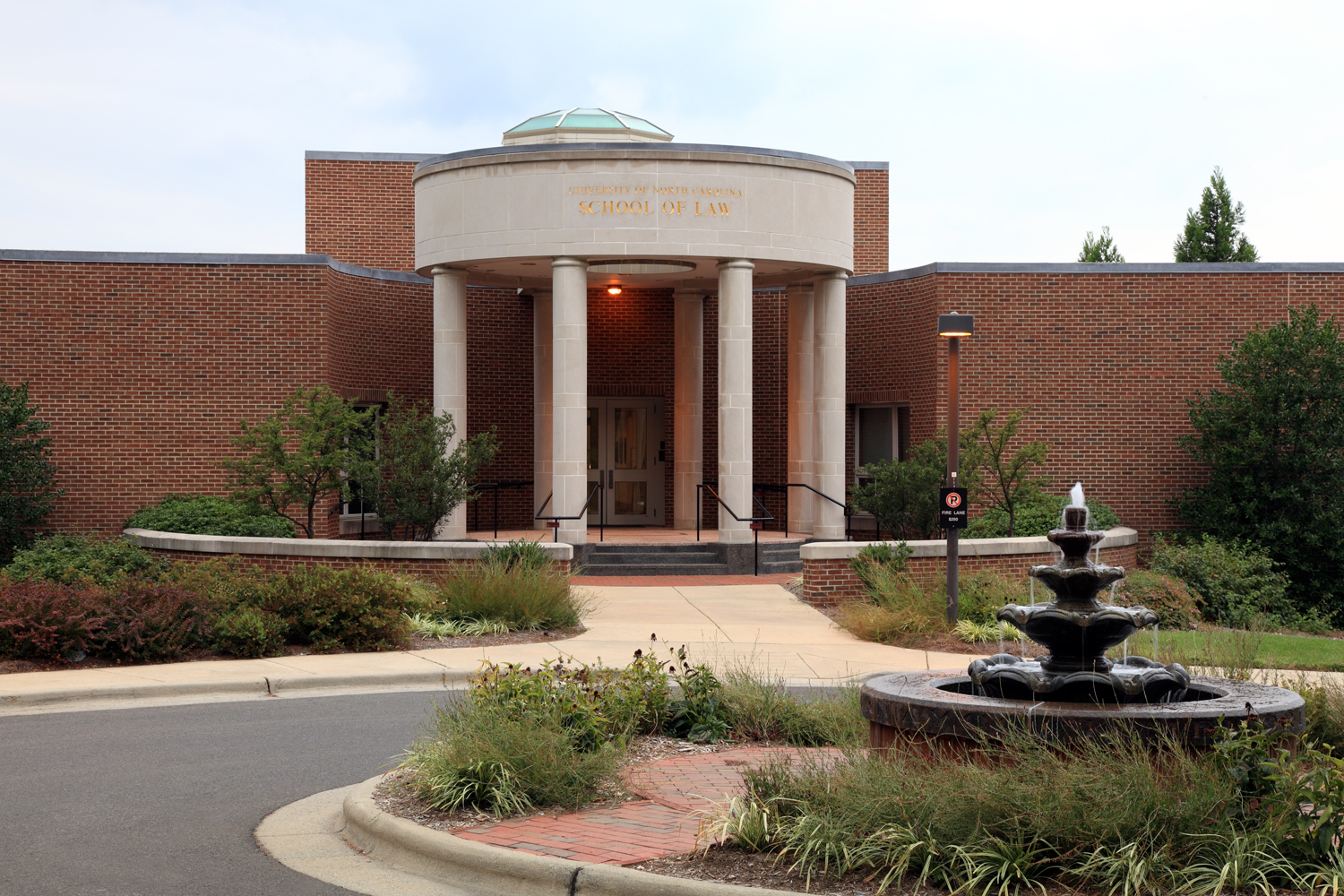
School of Law at the University of North Carolina at Chapel Hill

The case Student Bar Association v. Byrd decided by the North Carolina Supreme Court in 1977 highlighted problems with the original law and prompted the legislature to strengthen it in 1979. The case, in which the Student Bar Association of the University of North Carolina at Chapel Hill (UNC-CH) sued the Dean of the School of Law, ruled that the open meetings law did not apply to meetings of faculty and that the law did not require advance notice covered public meetings. The revision to North Carolina's General Statutes repealed Article 33B of Section 143 and replaced it with Article 33C, expanding and clarifying the types of meetings covered ("All official meetings of public bodies") and adding an explicit public notice requirement.

The law was significantly revised again in 1994, reducing the number of allowable reasons for closed meetings from 21 to 7. Other changes in this revision included requiring reasons and minutes for closed sessions; penalties for violation of the law; and explicitly naming all appointed boards, The University of North Carolina, and its constituent institutions as public bodies covered under the law.

Over time, appellate court cases have helped refine interpretation of North Carolina's open meetings law. Two such cases clarified the definition of a public body, to include a nonprofit corporation that replaces a public agency substantially unchanged but to exclude a nonprofit corporation no longer connected to its founding agency. Another case focused specifically on the application of the law within the state university system, finding that the UNC-CH Undergraduate Court is a public body subject to the open meetings law but also finding that a public body can hold a closed session to consider confidential student records.

== Application to the General Assembly ==
North Carolina's open meetings law applies to the General Assembly's committees, subcommittees, and study commissions. This law does not apply to the Legislative Ethics Committee or to General Assembly caucuses and conference committees, while prohibiting participation in any caucus formed for the purpose of avoiding the open meetings law.

== Enforcement ==
The open meetings law is enforced through lawsuits filed by members of the public or the media in Superior Court. Enforcement can take three forms: injunction prohibiting future violations and thus treating any future violations as contempt of court, invalidation of decisions made in violation of the law, and payment of the winner's attorneys' fees by the loser, including requiring public officials to pay these fees personally in some cases.

== Criticism ==
The open meetings law currently does not apply unless a majority of members are present in the meeting. Because some local governments maintain regular schedules of smaller meetings, there have been calls to close this so-called "nonmajority loophole."

== Recent Controversies ==
A lawsuit by former UNC-CH Provost Christopher Clemens alleges that the Board of Trustees systematically misused closed-door sessions to discuss policy issues that were required to be debated in open session, such as the fiscal impacts of tenure decisions, the hiring of Bill Belichick as football coach, and other athletics matters.

Public records requests by The Alamance News find text and email communications among Graham city council members about issues such as the relocation of Sesquicentennial Park and data from Flock cameras, seemingly in violation of North Carolina's open meeting laws. North Carolina Press attorney emphasized that, under the state's open meetings law, "The public's business is to be conducted in public, not in emails and text messages outside of public view."

== Resources ==
- Open Government Guide from North Carolina Attorney General's office (2019)
- Open Meetings and Local Governments in North Carolina: Some Questions and Answers (8th edition, 2017)
- NC Open Meetings Law microsite from UNC-CH School of Government
- North Carolina Open Government Coalition
