= Carsharing in Moscow =

Alternative transport in Moscow

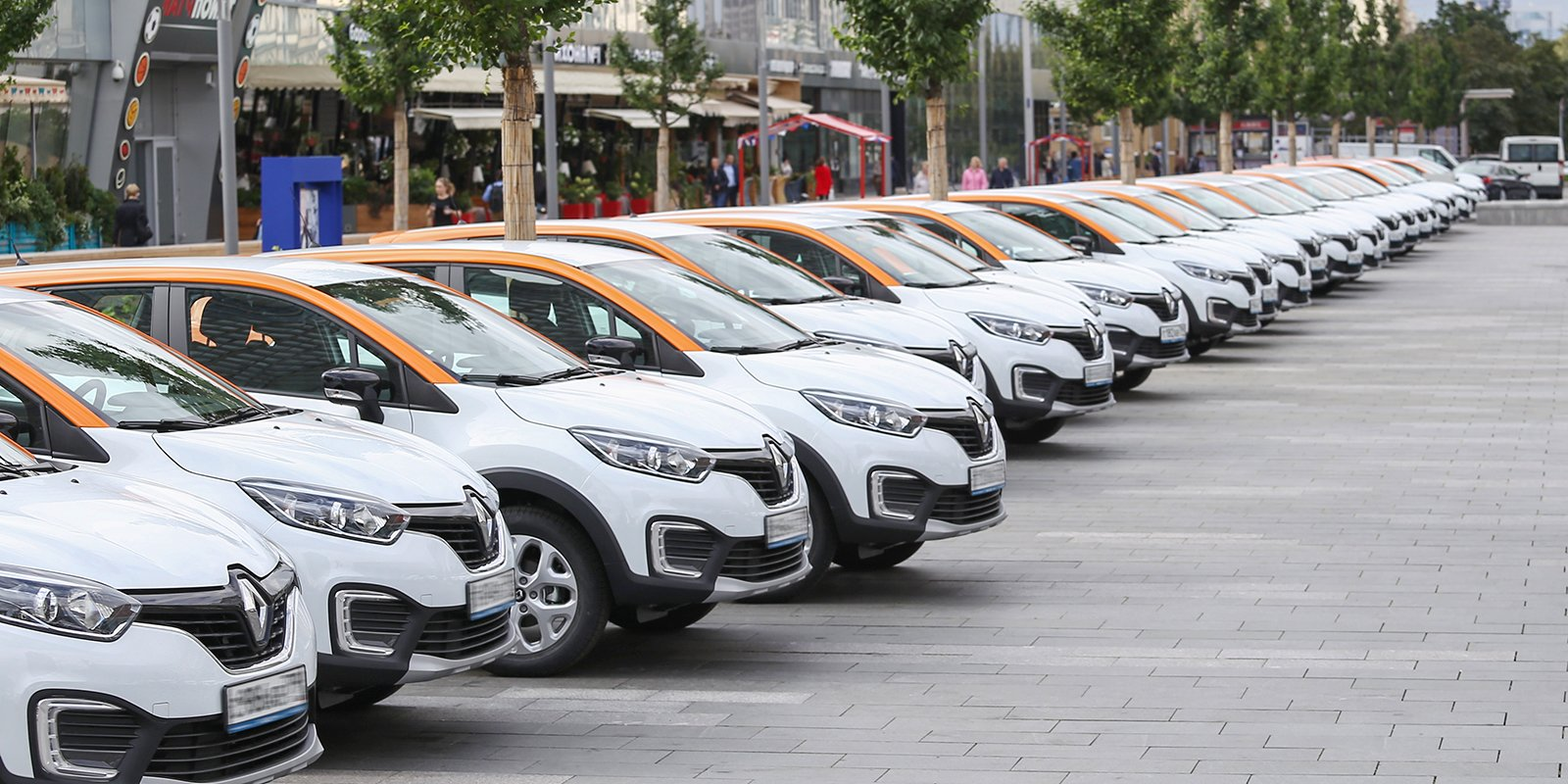
Carsharing vehicles at New Arbat Avenue in Moscow

Carsharing in Moscow is a rapidly developing type of public transport in the city alongside Moscow Metro. As of December 2024 Moscow believes to be the largest fleet of carsharing vehicles in the world which counts more than 40,000 cars with 1.7 million regular users (141,000 daily trips, 6-7 trips by a car per day). The largest carsharing operator in Moscow is Delimobil which has a fleet of 17,000 cars.

== Overview ==
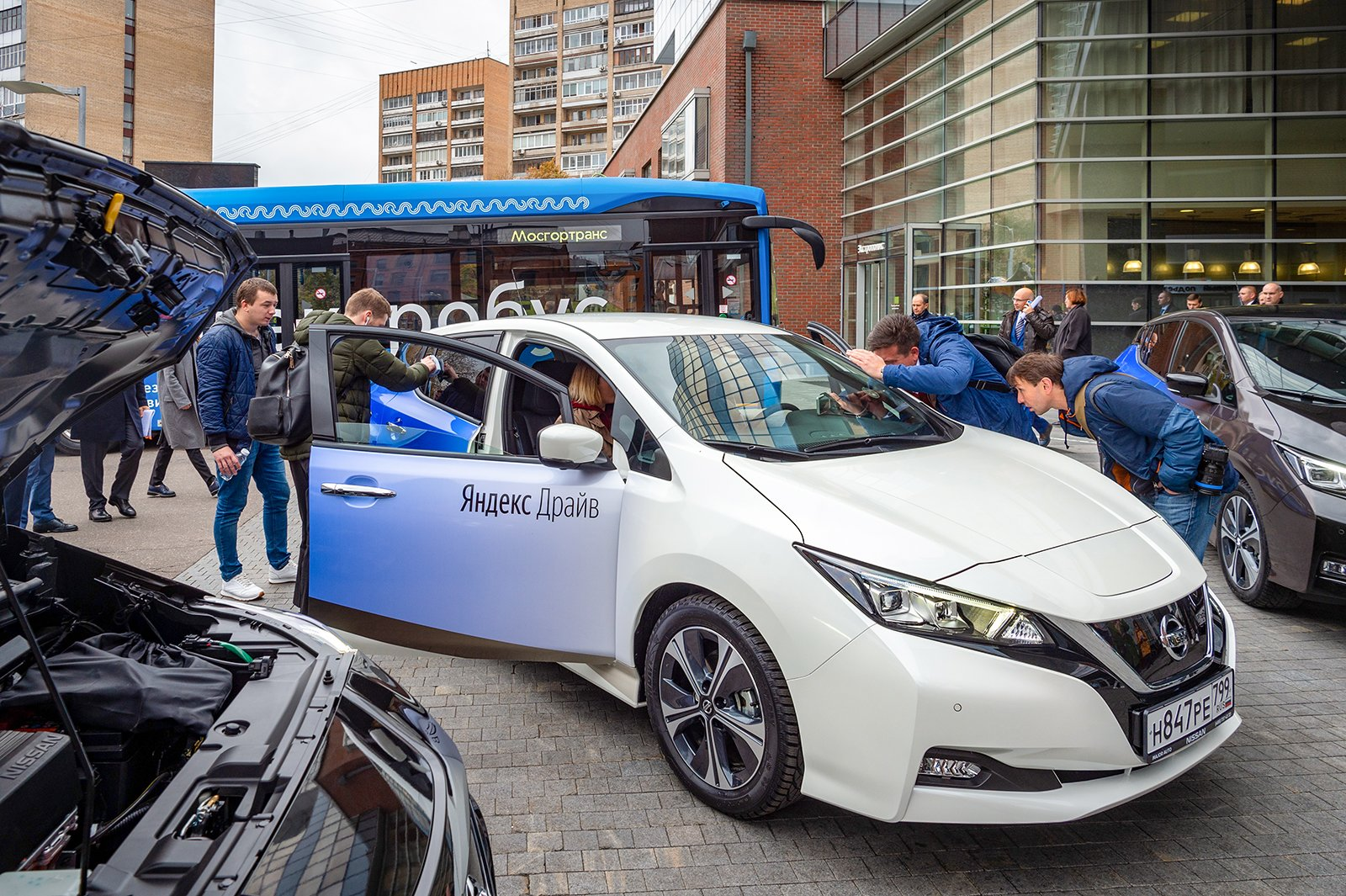
Carshare vehicles pictured in Moscow in 2019

In 2019 the fleet of carshare vehicles in Moscow reached 30,000, almost double from the previous year, outpacing expectations. Some industry insiders say there is a potential for as many as 100,000 carshare vehicles to eventually become available.

In addition to preferential municipal parking for carsharing vehicles, the Moscow Government exempts electric vehicles from paying transport tax.

Moscow Mayor Sergey Sobyanin and the head of Yandex Arkady Volozh participated in an event dedicated to the launch of Yandex.Drive's electric vehicles in late September 2019.

Thirty electric Nissan Leafs branded by Yandex.Drive became available in Moscow in 2019. A number of electric vehicles of different models are also available from other carsharing operators.

== Operators and fleet ==
The table below provides information about the largest carsharing operators in Moscow.

Operator	Minimal fee	Fleet	Car models	Sources
Yandex.Drive	5 RUB/min; 0.08 USD/min	16.000 (as of June 2021)	Passenger cars: Kia Rio (incl. X-Line); Renault Kaptur; Audi A3 and Q3 (incl. Quattro); BMW 320d, 520i and X1; Ford Mustang 1965 Fastback and Mustang 1969; Genesis G70; Mercedes-Benz E200 and C180; Nissan Qashqai and Leaf; Hyundai Solaris and Creta; Škoda Octavia and Rapid; Toyota RAV4; Volkswagen Polo; Volvo XC40 and XC60; Passenger vans: Volkswagen Caravelle and Kombi; Cargo vans: Citroën Jumpy, Ford Transit, Peugeot Expert, Volkswagen Transporter	
Delimobil	4 RUB/min; 0.07 USD/min	17.000 (as of September 2021)	Audi A3 and Q3; BMW 320i; Fiat 500; Hyundai Solaris; Kia Rio (incl. X-Line) and Sportage; Mercedes-Benz E200 and GLC; Mini Cooper 3d and 5d; Nissan Qashqai; Renault Kaptur and Sandero; Smart Fortwo сoupe and Forfour; Volkswagen Polo	
BelkaCar	6 RUB/min	5.500 (as of September 2021)	Kia Rio X-Line; Mercedes-Benz CLA and GLA; Volkswagen Polo	
YouDrive	8 RUB/min	1000 (as of June 2019)	BMW i3, BMW 2 and X2; Mini Cooper; Mercedes-Benz A; Nissan X-Trail; Smart Fortwo and Forfour	
MatreshCar	9 RUB/min	700 (as of June 2019)	BMW 320i; Kia Stinger; Mercedes Benz C180; Mazda 3; Land Rover Discovery Sport; Smart ForTwo and ForFour; Mini Countryman; Jaguar XE	

== Long-time subscribing ==
Some operators provide long-term rentals. Subscription plans include car and mileage, but not include free parking in city, washing and refueling

== Statistics ==
World cities by carsharing fleet in 2018
city	fleet in units
Tokyo	19.800
Moscow	16.500
Beijing	15.400
Shanghai	13.900
Guangzhou	4.200

Year	Number of vehicles	Number of trips, in million	Commentaries	Sources
2012	21	-	120 users by the end of year (Anytime)	
2013	72	-	~7,000 users by the end of year (Anytime + StreetCar)	
2014	160	-	-	
2015	500	0.035	15,000 users by the end of year	
2016	1,500	1.6	150,000 users by the end of year	
2017	—	6.5		
2018	16,500	23		
2019	31,000	47	580 million kilometers driven	
2020	40,000 (forecast)	—	All operators now provide mandatory third-party liability insurance covering up to 2 million RUB per incident	
2023	42,000	68	65% of users aged 18–34; peak usage weekdays 8–10 AM & 6–8 PM	

== History ==
=== 2012 ===
Moscow's first carsharing service was created on 21 December 2012 by Alexander Yermolenko, commissioned by Citycar, which was rebranded as Anytime. The company launched a pilot project on 21 Volkswagen Polo vehicles.

=== 2013 ===
Anytime added a few BMW 1 Series cars to its fleet and expanded to 72 vehicles.

=== 2014 ===
In February 2014, StreetCar launched its own carsharing service in St Petersburg.

Anytime acquired a further 100 vehicles, adding the BMW 1 Series, Chevrolet Cruze, VW Polo and Hyundai Solaris to its fleet.

The same year Anytime launched the St Petersburg market with a plan to unite the two capitals in a common carsharing service, with the ability to take and leave cars in either city.

On 1 August 2014, the Moscow City Pay-Parking System is expanding to the boundaries of the Third Ring Road, which serves to raise the attention on carsharing as part of the Public Transportation System.

=== 2015 ===
Due to the low commercial success of carsharing in St Petersburg, StreetCar closes down and Anytime stops operating its branch in St Petersburg, focusing on the Moscow market.

In 2015, Moscow's paid parking zone expanded beyond the Third Ring Road, giving a huge boost to carsharing in Russia.

Vincenzo Trani launched his own carsharing service Delimobil in September 2015.

A new BelkaCar carsharing service was announced.

Anytime launches a truck rental service for small trucks.

=== 2016 ===
Launch of BelkaCar, a new entrant to the carsharing market with a fleet of 100 cars.

The overall carshare fleet in Moscow has exceeded 1,500 cars.

=== 2017 ===
Transition to fully remote registration of users in the carsharing system, without signing paper contracts.

Anytime and BelkaCar cars appeared in Yandex Maps app. By the end of the year, Yandex will close the carshare aggregator project and develop its own service.

Delimobil comes to the St Petersburg market.

Moscow carsharing begins to expand in Russia's regions. Launch of new carsharing providers: Rentmee, Carousel, Carlion, Easyride, Carenda, Lifcar, Car4You.

=== 2018 ===
In May 2018, Anytime and Delimobil merged into a single entity, becoming the largest carsharing company in Russia. Vincenzo Trani and Mikro Kapital will take over full management of the companies.

Moscow-based Anytime is changing its business model to the premium segment. Anytime opens in Belarus, Kazakhstan and the Czech Republic.

Yandex launches its own carsharing service, Yandex.Drive, with a fleet of 750 cars.

=== 2019 ===
Delimobil is planning an IPO.

The number of rides on Moscow's carsharing system has reached 50mn.

The number of cars involved in carsharing reached 31,000.

The outstanding growth in the volume of carsharing vehicles in the Russian capital made it one of the leading car sharing market players worldwide. In 2019, Moscow beat the previous year's leader - Tokyo.

=== 2020 ===
Since 2020, all Moscow carsharing operators provide mandatory third-party liability insurance covering up to 2 million RUB per incident, with optional full-coverage plans.

== See also ==
- Moscow Metro
