= Sílvia Osuna Oliveras =

Spanish chemist

Sílvia Osuna Oliveras (Castelló d’Empúries, Girona, 28 November 1983) is a researcher in the field of computational chemistry at the Institute of Computational Chemistry and Catalysis (IQCC) at the University of Girona.

Osuna obtained her PhD in 2010 at the University of Girona (Spain) under the supervision of Miquel Solà and Marcel Swart. Upon graduation, she moved to the University of California, Los Angeles (UCLA, USA) for a two-year postdoctoral position at the group of Prof. K. N. Houk. In 2013, she was awarded the Juan de la Cierva postdoctoral position, and in 2015 the Ramón y Cajal position. In 2015, she was awarded an ERC-StG project for developing a new computational protocol for designing new enzymes (ERC-2015-StG-679001, NetMoDEzyme).

She is currently the group leader of CompBioLab group at the Institute of Computational Chemistry and Catalysis (IQCC) at the University of Girona. During her scientific career, she has worked on the computational design of enzymes important for their potential applications in medicine. Osuna is author of several publications in international peer-reviewed journals.

In 2016 Osuna was awarded the Premio FPdGi Investigación Científica 2016 by Fundació Princesa de Girona.
