= GAMA202627 =

Barred spiral galaxy in the constellation Hydra

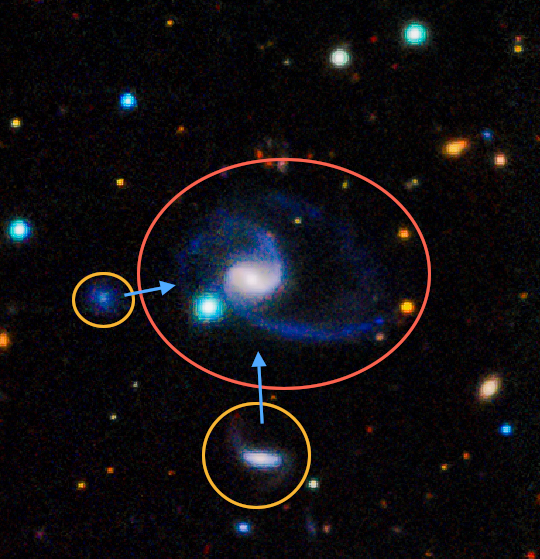
- False-colour image of GAMA202627, with its two close companions highlighted.

Observation data (J2000 epoch)
- Constellation: Hydra
- Right ascension: 08^{h} 42^{m} 28.3^{s}
- Declination: −00° 16′ 18″
- Redshift: 0.051219±0.000123
- Heliocentric radial velocity: 15355±37 km/s
- Galactocentric velocity: 15199±37 km/s
- Distance: 700 Mly (214.62 Mpc)
- Apparent magnitude (V): 16.1

Characteristics
- Type: SBbc
- Size: ~100,000 ly (diameter); 200,000 ly (arms)
- Apparent size (V): 0.5 x 0.3 moa

Other designations
- PGC 165514, IRAS 08399-0005

GAMA202627 (also known as G202627 or PGC 165514) is a barred spiral galaxy similar to our own Milky Way, located 700 million light-years from Earth in the Constellation of Hydra.

The galaxy was described in a 2012 paper by astronomer Dr Aaron Robotham, jointly from the University of Western Australia node of the International Centre for Radio Astronomy Research (ICRAR) and the University of St Andrews in Scotland, when he searched for groups of galaxies similar to ours in the most detailed map of the local Universe yet, the Galaxy And Mass Assembly survey (GAMA). The Galaxy and Mass Assembly (GAMA) survey is an international collaboration led from ICRAR and the Australian Astronomical Observatory to map our local Universe in closer detail. The galaxy has a redshift measured at z = 0.051219 +/- 0.000123, which corresponds to a distance of 705 Mly, or 216 Mpc.

Dr Robotham noted, "We found about 3% of galaxies similar to the Milky Way have companion galaxies like the Magellanic Clouds, which is very rare indeed. In total we found 14 galaxy systems that are similar to ours, with two of those being an almost exact match."

The Milky Way is surrounded by its close companions, the Large and Small Magellanic Clouds, which are visible in the southern sky. Many galaxies have smaller galaxies in orbit around them, but few have two that are as large as the Magellanic Clouds. That is why GAMA202627 is so unique as it has two massive satellite galaxies in close proximity.
