= Order of the Star of Italy =

Italian order of knighthood

Order of the Star of Italy Ordine della Stella d'Italia
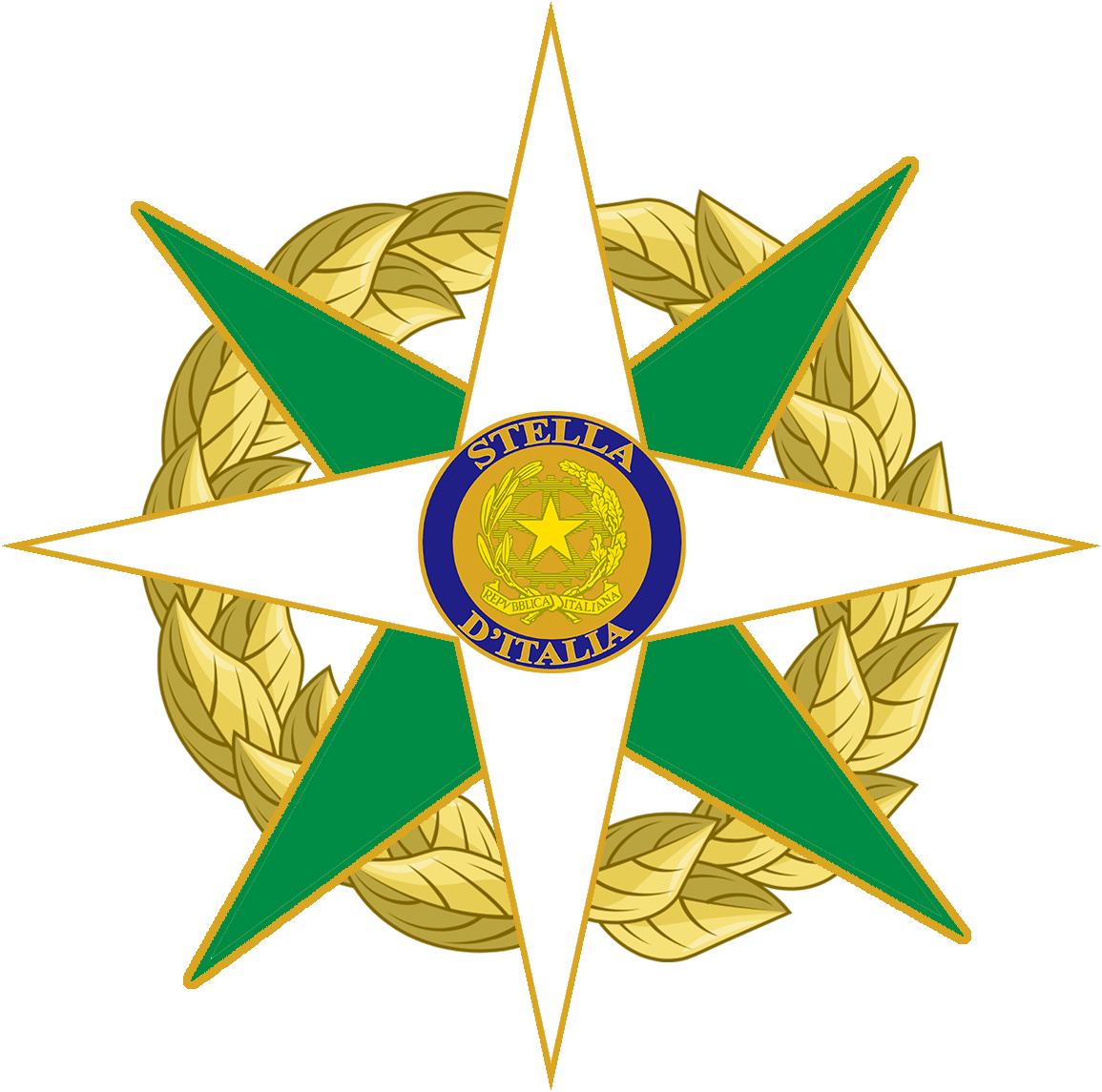
- Emblem of the order

Awarded by the Italian Republic
- Type: Order of chivalry
- Established: 3 February 2011; 15 years ago
- Country: Italy
- Eligibility: All civilians
- Criteria: Preservation and promotion of national prestige abroad, promoting friendly relations and co-operation with other countries and ties with Italy
- Status: Currently constituted
- Grand Master: President of the Republic
- Council Chair: Minister of Foreign Affairs
- Grades: Grand Cross of Honour; Knight Grand Cross; Grand Officer; Commander; Officer; Knight
- Post-nominals: OSI
- Website: www.quirinale.it/page/stellaitalia

Precedence
- Next (higher): Order of Merit for Labour
- Next (lower): Order of Vittorio Veneto
- Related: Order of the Star of Italian Solidarity
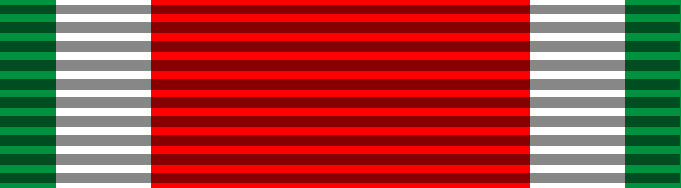
- Ribbon of the order

The Order of the Star of Italy (Italian: Ordine della Stella d'Italia [ˈordine della ˈѕtɛlla diˈtaːlja]) is an Italian order of chivalry that was founded in 2011. The order was reformed from the 1947 Order of the Star of Italian Solidarity by the 11th President of Italy, Giorgio Napolitano. The emphasis of the reformed award was shifted from post-war reconstruction to the preservation and promotion of national prestige abroad, promoting friendly relations and co-operation with other countries and ties with Italy.

== Order of the Star of Italy ==
This distinction, which qualifies as a second civilian honour of the State, represents a particular honour on behalf of all those, Italians abroad or foreigners, who have acquired special merit in the promotion of friendly relations and cooperation between Italy and other countries and the promotion of ties with Italy. The reasons for granting the award transcend the original connotation of the previous post-war award being granted to those who, Italians abroad or foreigners, especially contributed to the reconstruction of Italy post-Second World War. The nomination conferring the modern-day honour is aimed at supporting the preservation and promotion of national prestige abroad, such as the promotion of the Italian language, volunteering and charitable philanthropic activities, participation in community life of communities abroad, scientific and technological research, pastoral missions, commercial enterprises, as well as the promotion of food and wine and service.

The order is conferred by the President of the Republic on the proposal of the Minister of Foreign Affairs, after consulting the Council of the Order, which shall be chaired by the Minister himself and is composed of four members, one of which is by law the Head of the Diplomatic Protocol of the Republic. A further innovation is the order of the classes, which increased from three to five: Knight Grand Cross, Grand Officer, Commander, Officer and Knight, plus the special class of the Grand Cross of Honour.

The Order of the Star of Italy drops the Christian symbolism from the Order of the Star of Italian Solidarity, where the centre of the stars and other insignia are replaced by a circular shield of gold, edged in blue and gold emblem bearing a depiction of the symbol of the republic at the center with the words "STELLA D'ITALIA" in gold letters around the edge.

The implementing regulation was issued by the Presidential Decree dated 15 November 2011, n. 221 and is in force since 28 January 2012.

For the year 2012 it was expected for there to be 400 honors awarded, broken down as:

- Knight Grand Cross: 10
- Grand Officer: 60
- Commander: 70
- Officer: 100
- Knight: 160

To these can be added up to 10 grand crosses of honour.

The first awards of the Knight Grand Cross were awarded to Alfio Piva Mesen and Fouad Twal on 2 May 2012.

The present classes of the Order are as follows:

Ribbons
| Knight | Officer | Commander | Grand Officer | Knight Grand Cross | Grand Cross of Honour |

== Recipients ==
As of May 2021, the Order has been awarded as follows:

=== Grand Cross of Honour ===
2 awards.

- Carlo Urbani
- Barbara de Anna

=== Knight Grand Cross ===
24 awards.

- Riccardo Paternò di Montecupo
- Fouad Twal
- Alfio Piva
- Michel Roger
- Steffen Seibert-Gundelach
- Horst Lorenz Seehofer
- Furio Radin
- Charlene, Princess of Monaco
- Ana Hrustanovich
- Torcuato Salvador Francisco Nicolás di Tella
- Romaldo Giurgola
- Ankie Broekers-Knol
- Esteban José Bullrich
- Sergio Alejandro Bergman
- José Lino Salvador Barañao
- Alejandro Pablo Avelluto
- Nicola Renzi
- Riccardo Guariglia
- Yongyu Huang
- John Eliot Gardiner
- Francisco Maria de Sousa Ribeiro Telles
- Gianfranco Ravasi
- Teresa Scavelli
- Enzo Bagnoli
- Nechirvan Barzani

=== Other ranks ===
Appointments include:

- Carlo Ancelotti
- Gianni De Biasi
- Chiara Bisagni
- Ben Chan
- Rui Chenggang
- Dr Giovanni Coci
- Margarita Forés
- Ehud Gazit
- Erol Gelenbe
- Ms Wajiha Haris
- Valentina Imbeni
- Ananda Sukarlan
- Douglas Leone
- Edward Leigh
- Dario Martinelli
- Gennaro Contaldo
- Jamie Oliver
- Antonio Pennacchia
- Patrick Cassidy
- İlber Ortaylı
- Ferzan Özpetek
- António Filipe Pimentel
- Nanda Rea
- Andriy Shevchenko
- Fatih Terim
- Lyndon Terracini
- Vincenzo Trani
- John Turturro
- Maksym Tymoshenko
- Fu Xiaotian
- Serra Yılmaz
- Mari Yamazaki
- Milja Köpsi
- Paul Borg Olivier
- Brad Hutton
- Senen Agustin S. De Santos
- Fernando Alonso
- Myung-whun Chung
- Theo Randall
