= Ramón y Cajal (scholarship) =

Spanish college scholarship for foreigners

The Ramón y Cajal 5-year tenure track contract (RyC) is funded by the Spanish Ministry of Science, that allows outstanding mid-career researchers in foreign countries to establish themselves in Spanish research institutions. Together with the more junior Juan de la Cierva scholarship, it is the most prestigious nationally-funded research contract to follow a scientific career in Spain. In fact, it is considered the main talent attraction strategy for Spain to counteract its scientific brain drain.

== History ==
The contract honors the Spanish neuroscientist Santiago Ramón y Cajal. It started back in 2001, and it has been awarded every year since then, to date (January 2023). It provides 5 years of funding, after which the institution is encouraged to open a permanent position to the researcher, although this is often not guaranteed.

During the European debt crisis, the funding was drastically reduced, reaching a 40% cut, and even skipping a call. Especially since then, there have been regular complaints about the RyC program, concerning its bureaucracy, employment instability, unfair process, harsh conditions, obscurity, precarity, or gender discrimination.

In 2022, and thanks to Next Generation EU funds, the RyC budget increased to 138 million euro, with 647 positions opened, although the increase won't continue in 2023.

== Impact ==
Research on the programme shows the applicants are typically in their mid-thirties, highly productive and highly mobile, over the national average.

The contract has been funding prestigious researchers in Spain, typically bringing them from overseas, across all disciplines, including Biology, Physics, Mathematics, Medicine, History, Geology, Ecology, Social sciences or Engineering. The scholarship supports institutions across all Spanish regions, although Catalonia concentrates the most, with 26% of the total as of 2023.

Some notable Ramón y Cajal scholars are Carlota Escutia Dotti, Brian Vohnsen, Aditi Sen De, Mayo Fuster Morell, Carolina Mallol, Mercedes Vila, Maritza Lara-López, Nanda Rea, Mercedes López-Morales.
