= Carolina Mallol =

Spanish archaeological researcher

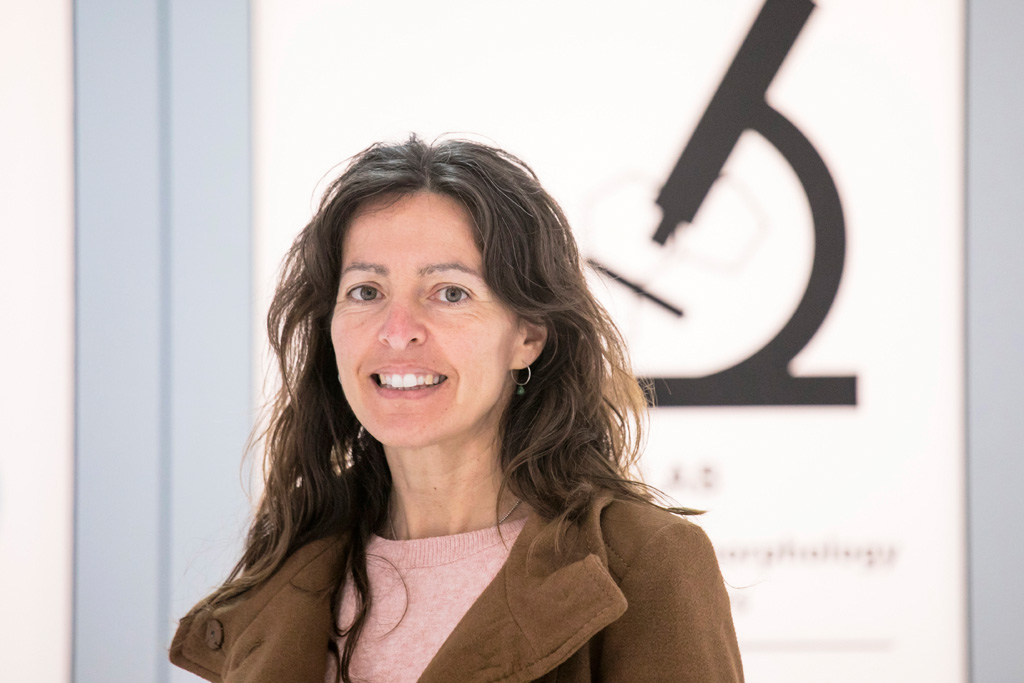
- Born: 2 October 1973 (age 53); Barcelona
- Occupation: Researcher in archaeological science

Academic background
- Education: Harvard University
- Thesis: Micromorphological observations from the archaeological sediments of ‘Ubeidiya(Israel), Dmanisi (Georgia), and Gran Dolina (Spain) for the reconstruction of hominid occupation contexts (2004)
- Doctoral advisor: Ofer Bar-Yosef

Academic work
- Discipline: Archaeology
- Sub-discipline: Geoarchaeology
- Institutions: Universidad de La Laguna

Carolina Mallol was born in Barcelona, Spain in 1973, and is a professor and researcher of archaeological science at the University of La Laguna in Tenerife, Spain.

== Education ==
Mallol graduated from Universitat Rovira i Virgili, Spain with her BA and MA in Geography and History, followed by an MA in 1999 then PhD in Anthropology at Harvard University in 2004. She was awarded a National Science Foundation grant for her PhD research, comprising a geoarchaeological study of three Lower Paleolithic sites.

== Career and research ==
Since 2014 Mallol has held the position of Ramón y Cajal researcher and lecturer at the University of La Laguna, Spain. Prior to this she was a Juan de La Cierva Post-doc at Universidad de La Laguna, Spain from 2009–2013. From 2006–2008 she held a Marie Curie Intra-European Fellowship at Centre National de la Recherche Scientifique (CNRS-UMR 6636), France, and from 2004–2005 was ASPR Postdoctoral Fellow Harvard University.

Mallol's research focuses on early hominids and pyrotechnology, using soil science and biogeochemistry. She has worked on campfire remains at many Neanderthal sites including in El Salt and Abric del Pastor, near the town of Alcoy (southeastern Spain), as well as Middle Paleolithic remains in France, Georgia, Armenia and Uzbekistan. She has been Principal Investigator of 3 consecutive major research projects funded by the Leakey Foundation on Neandertal Fire Technology. From 2014-2016: (Co-PI). MISTI Co-PI of a MISTI Global Seeds Fund project (MIT) on "Paleoenvironmentary and Paleodietary Reconstruction of Early Hominin Sites", and was awarded a European Research Council Consolidator 2014 grant (PALEOCHAR).

== Awards ==
In 2013 Mallol was awarded The UCLA Cotsen Prize in History. In 2016 she was awarded the IUEM 8 March Prize (Instituto Universitario de Estudios de las Mujeres), awarded annually by the University Institute of Women's studies of the Universidad de la Laguna with outstanding research records.

== Selected publications ==
- Mallol, C. and Goldberg, P. (2017). Caves and Rockshelter Sediments. In C. Nicosia and G. Stoops (eds.), Archaeological Soil and Sediment Micromorphology. Hoboken, NJ: Wiley, pp. 359–377.
- Mallol, C. and Mentzer, S.M. (2017). Contacts under the lens: Perspectives on the role of microstratigraphy in archaeological research. Archaeological and Anthropological Sciences, 9(8): 1645-1669.
- Mallol, C., Mentzer, S.M. and Miller, C.E. (2017). Combustion Features. In C. Nicosia and G. Stoops (eds.), Archaeological Soil and Sediment Micromorphology. Hoboken, NJ: Wiley, pp. 299–326.
- Pérez, L., Sanchis, A., Hernández, C.M., Galván, B., Sala, R. and Mallol, C.(2017). Hearths and bones: An experimental study to explore temporality in archaeological contexts based on taphonomical changes in burnt bones. Journal of Archaeological Science Reports, 11: 287-309.
- Mallol, C. and Henry, A. (2017). Ethnoarchaeology of paleolithic fire: methodological considerations. Current Anthropology, 58(S16): 217-229.
- Égüez, N., Mallol, C., Martín-Socas, D. and Camalich, M.D. (2016). Radiometric dates and micromorphological evidence for synchronous domestic activity and sheep penning in a Neolithic cave: Cueva del Toro (Málaga, Antequera, Spain). Archaeological and Anthropological Sciences, 8(1): 107-123.
- Mallol, C. and Hernández, C. (2016). Advances in palimpsest dissection. Quaternary International, 417: 1-2.
- Vidal-Matutano, P., Hernández, C.M., Galván, B. and Mallol (2015). Neanderthal firewood management: evidence from Stratigraphic Unit IV of Abric del Pastor (Eastern Iberia). Quaternary Science Reviews, 111: 81-93. Machado, J., Mallol, C. and Hernández, C.M. (2015). Insights into Eurasian Middle Paleolithic Settlement Dynamics: The Palimpsest Problem . In N.J. Conard and A. Delagnes (eds.), Settlement Dynamics of the Middle Paleolithic and Middle Stone Age. Volume IV. Tübingen: Tübingen Publications in Prehistory, p. 361-382.
- Mallol, C. (2015). Aplicaciones en Geoarqueología. In J.C. Loaiza, G. Stoops, R.M. Poch and M. Casamitjana (eds.), El Manual de Micromorfología de suelos y técnicas complementarias. Institución Universitaria Pascual Bravo. pp. 321–352.
- Adler, D.S., Wilkinson, K.N., Blockley, S., Mark, D.F., Pinhasi, R., Schmidt-Magee, B.A., Nahapetyan, S., Mallol, C., Berna, F., Glauberman, P.J., Raczynski-Henk, Y., Wales, N., Frahm, E., Jöris, O., MacLeod, A., Smith, V.C., Cullen, V.L. and Gasparian, B. (2014). Early Levallois technology and the Lower to Middle Paleolithic transition in the Southern Caucasus. 345(6204): 1609-1613.
- Nigst, P.R., Haesaerts, P., Damblon, F., Frank-Fellner, C., Mallol, C., Viola, B., Götzinger, M., Niven, L., Trnka, G. and Hublin, J.-J. (2014). Early modern human settlement of Europe north of the Alps occurred 43,500 years ago in a cold steppe-type environment. Proceedings of the National Academy of Sciences, 111(40): 14394-14399.
- Garralda, M.D., Galván, B., Hernández, C.M., Mallol, C., Gómez, J.A. and Maureille, B. (2014). Neanderthals from El Salt (Alcoy, Spain) in the context of the latest Middle Palaeolithic populations from the southeast of the Iberian Peninsula. Journal of Human Evolution, 75: 1-15.
- Galván, B., Hernández, C.M., Mallol, C., Merciers, N., Sistiaga, A. and Soler, V. (2014). New evidence of early Neanderthal disappearance in the Iberian Peninsula. Journal of Human Evolution, 75: 16-27.
- Sistiaga, A., Mallol, C., Galván, B. and Summons, R.E. (2014). The Neanderthal meal: a new perspective using faecal biomarkers. PLOS ONE, 9-6: e101045-e101045
