= Mayo Fuster Morell =

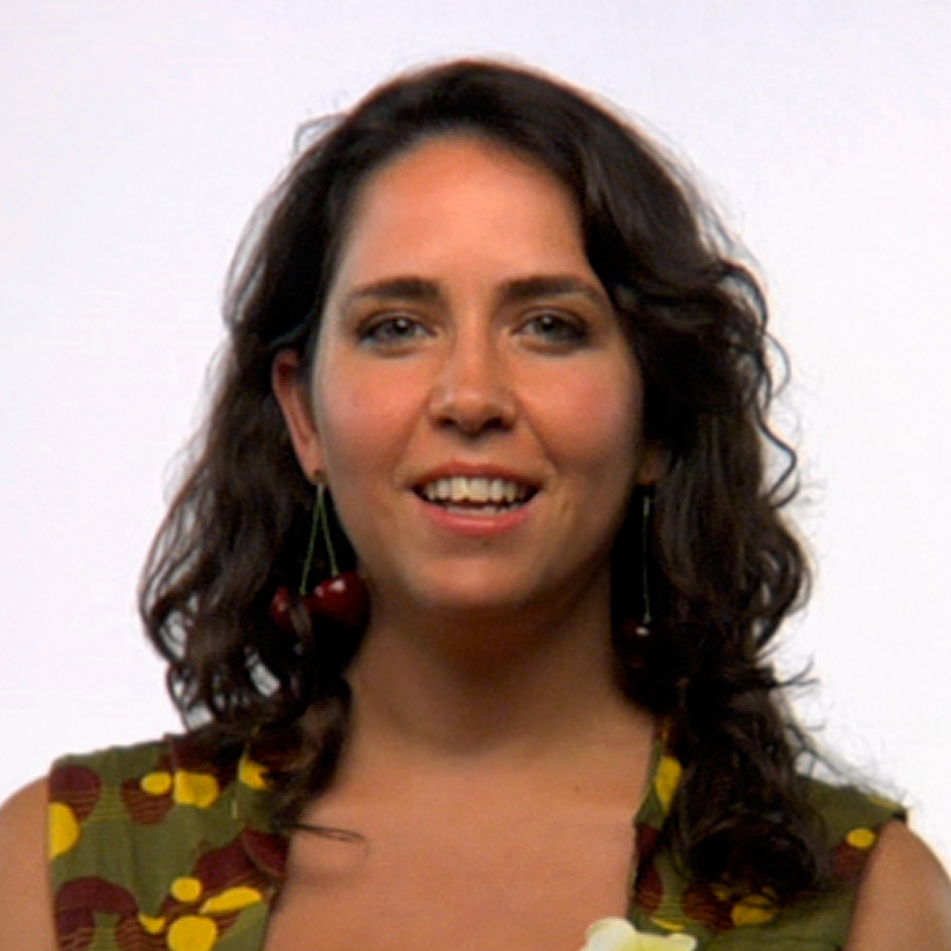
- Born: Mayo Fuster Morell; 8 December 1975 (age 50); Oliva, Valencia, Spain
- Education: University of Valencia, Universitat Rovira i Virgili, European University Institute
- Known for: Governance of Commons-based peer production
- Scientific career
- Fields: Commons-based peer production, online communities, social movements
- Workplaces: Universitat Autonoma de Barcelona, Berkman Center for Internet & Society
- Doctoral advisor: Donatella della Porta, Joan Subirats

Mayo Fuster Morell (born 1975) is a social researcher. Her research has focused on sharing economy, social movements, online communities and digital commons, frequently using participatory action research and method triangulation. She has been part of the most important research centres studying Internet and its social effects, including the Berkman Center for Internet and Society, the MIT Center for Civic Media or the Berkeley School of Information. As an active citizen, she is the co-founder of multiple initiatives around digital commons and free culture.

== Education ==
Her inter-disciplinary background is grounded in a wide range of academic studies. She has degrees on Economics (University of Valencia) and Anthropology (Universitat Rovira i Virgili), several post-graduate studies (University of London, Universitat Rovira i Virgili), a MPhil in NGO management (Universidad Complutense de Madrid), and MPhil and PhD in Social and Political Science (European University Institute, Florence).

Her PhD thesis, supervised by Donatella della Porta, performed the first large quantitative study on Commons-based peer production communities, providing insights on their governance and infrastructure provision. She combined a large N statistical analysis and case study comparisons (World Social Forum, Flickr, wikiHow and Wikipedia).

== Career ==
During her PhD, in 2008, she was visiting researcher at the School of Information, University of California Berkeley (sponsored by Howard Rheingold and Coye Cheshire) and provided teaching assistance at the Communication Department – Stanford University. In 2010, she was postdoctoral researcher at the Institute of Government and Public Policies (Autonomous University of Barcelona) and visiting scholar at the Internet Interdisciplinary Institute (Open University of Catalonia).

In 2011, she became a fellow of the Berkman Center for Internet and Society (Harvard University), and during two years she researched there in the dimension, evolution, and governance of Commons-based peer production under the supervision of Yochai Benkler. In 2012, she was visiting scholar at the MIT Center for Civic Media.

In 2013 she earned the Juan de la Cierva Spanish postdoctoral scholarship, coming back to the Institute of Government and Public Policies where she founded the IGOPnet research group. In 2014 she won the prestigious 5-year scholarship Ramón y Cajal. From 2016 to 2024 she has director of the research group on digital commons Dimmons in the IN3 at Open University of Catalonia. In 2024 (and since 2013) she is Faculty Associate at the Berkman Klein Center.

== Activist and social engagement ==
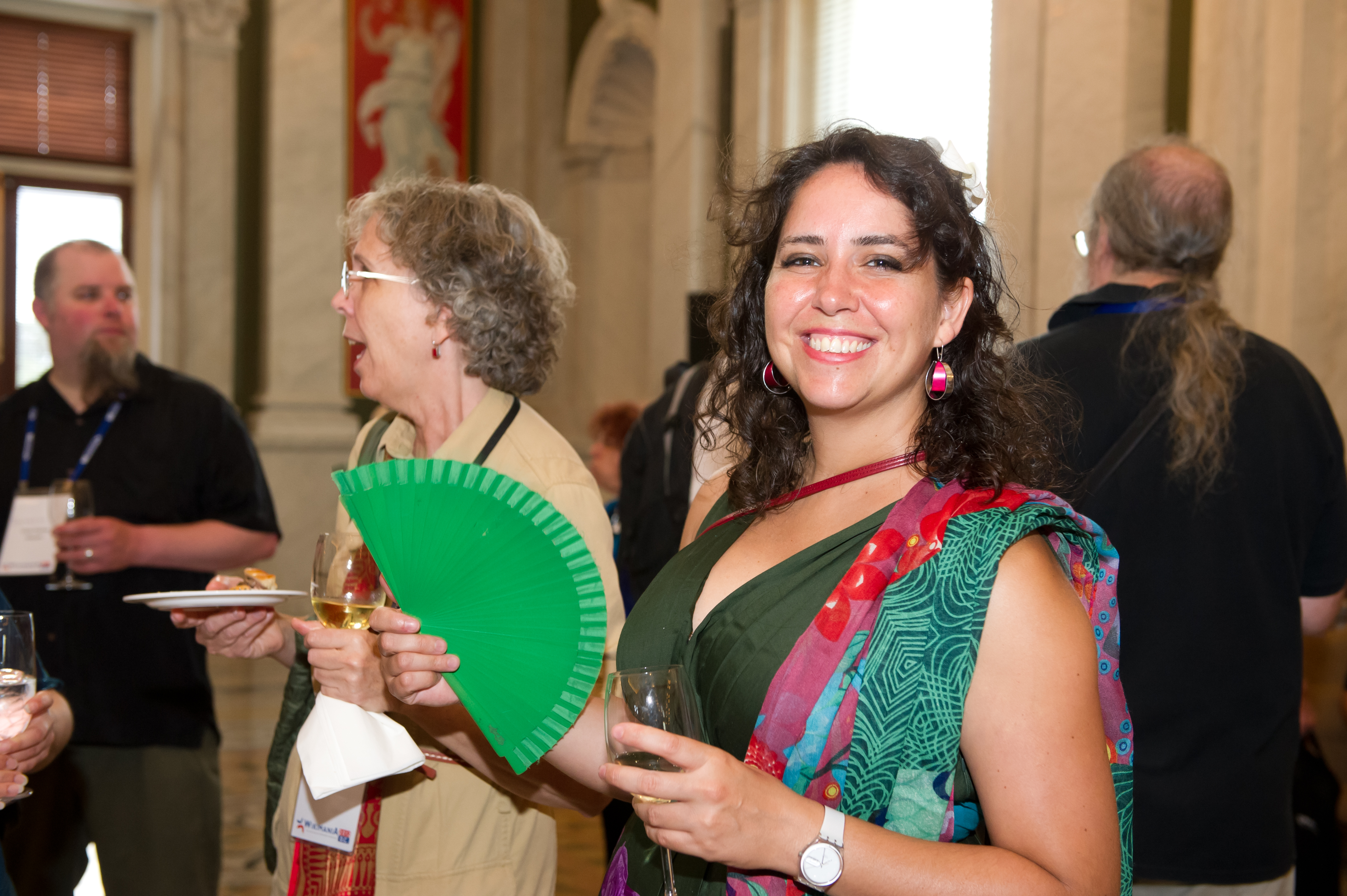
Fuster Morell at Wikimania 2012 Opening Ceremony at the Library of Congress

She started her activist engagement in the Anti-globalization movement, participating in the 2000 protests in Prague, engaging with the Catalonia's Movement de Resistencia Global (MRG) and Peoples' Global Action networks, and later actively participating in the series of World Social Forums and European Social Forums. More recently, she joined the 15-M Movement and Occupy Wall Street.

In 2004, with Jeff Juris and Enric Duran, she co-funded "Glocal, Centre de Recerca" (Glocal, Research Center), an association dedicated to social research and skill creation for activism. Under this frame, she co-created the cooperative space "Infoespai" (or Infospace) and Guia util per la transformació social (Useful Guide for the Social Transformation in Catalonia), both considered precedents of Enric Duran's subsequent popular projects.

Between 2006 and 2009 she co-promoted Networked Politics, a series of international creative seminars remixing people from different generations and political histories as a contribution to the debates and practical experiments concerning new forms of political organisation.

She has been co-founder of multiple initiatives around digital commons, such as the IGOPnet research group, the Free Culture Forum (2009 & 2010), the International Commons Conference 2010, the Escuela de los Commons in Barcelona, the Digital Commons Global Forum, while participating or being invited to many others. In 2011, she appeared in the Wikipedia donation banners. She collaborates with Spanish left-wing newspaper Eldiario.es.

== Work ==
Mayo Fuster Morell has been the lead researcher of Dimmons Research Group of the Internet Interdisciplinary Institute of the Open University of Catalonia (UOC), and the director of the Barcelona UOC Chair in digital economy: for a sharing economy focused on people's welfare and the Right to the City gathering the UOC, the Barcelona City Council and Barcelona Activa.

She has been the UOC's lead researcher of the National program project "Gender Digital project on gender equality in the digital sphere", and the European H2020 projects: PLUS: Platform Labor in Urban Spaces and DECODE: Building the next generation of cooperative data platforms for digital sovereignty, and P2Pvalue: Techno-social platform for sustainable models and value generation in commons-based peer production. Furthermore, Dimmons Research Group promoted feminist digitalization of social economy though Matchimpulsa.barcelona, an enterprises promotion program of 130 companies in Barcelona.

She has published more than 70 papers in the topics of social movements, online communities, commons-based peer production, Internet and politics, and public policies. Her works on governance of commons-based peer production are considered pioneering in the field. Her research on Wikipedia and on its governance is considered a reference on the field by media, and academics. and her works comparing the grassroots movements with the digital Commons have attracted international interest. She has contributed to major pieces of work concerning Open Data and Cultural Commons. She was Principal Investigator in the P2Pvalue European Project, where she led the creation of the Directory of Commons-based peer production initiatives, a unique contribution to the field. She leads the first COST Action on platform economy, which applies an intersectional feminist approach.

=== Scientific and social recognitions ===
- Advisory board of the Open Media Cluster (Italy)
- Affiliate member of The Network of Excellence in Internet Science.
- Board member of the Open Knowledge Foundation – Spanish Chapter.
- Editorial board of the Journal of Peer Production
- Member of the Research Committee of the Wikimedia Foundation
- Member of the steering committee of the Internet and Politics Standing group of the European Consortium of Political Science

== Selected works ==
- Grau Sarabia, Mónica; Fuster-Morell, Mayo (2021). "Gender approaches in the study of the digital economy: a systematic literature review". Humanities and Social Sciences Communication. 8 (1): 1–10. doi:10.1057/s41599-021-00875-x. hdl:10609/155215. S2CID 237285413.
- Senabre Hidalgo, Enric; Fuster Morell, Mayo; Espelt, Richard (2021). "Data for Sustainable Platform Economy: Connections between Platform Models and Sustainable Development Goals". Data. 6 (2): 7. doi:10.3390/data6020007. hdl:10609/130892.
- Fuster Morell, Mayo; Espelt, Richard; Renau Cano, M. (2020). "Sustainable Platform Economy: Connections with the Sustainable Development Goals". Sustainability. 12 (18): 7640. doi:10.3390/su12187640.
- Senabre Hidalgo, Enric; Fuster Morell, Mayo; Rodríguez, Enrique (2020). "Goteo.org civic crowdfunding and match-funding data connecting Sustainable Development Goals". Scientific Data. 7 (132): 132. Bibcode:2020NatSD...7..132F. doi:10.1038/s41597-020-0472-0. PMC 7190849. PMID 32350264. S2CID 216608977.
- Fuster Morell, Mayo; Espelt, Richard (2019). "A Framework to Assess the Sustainability of Platform Economy: The Case of Barcelona Ecosystem". Sustainability. 11 (22): 6450. doi:10.3390/su11226450. hdl:10609/104986.
- Fuster Morell, Mayo (2017). Benjamín, Tejerina; Perrugoría, Ignacia (eds.). From digital commons to society commons | Influence of the free culture movement in the 15M mobilization. Routledge. doi:10.4324/9781315574875. ISBN 978-1-315-57487-5.
- Iosub, Daniela; Laniado, David; Castillo, Carlos; Fuster Morell, Mayo; Kaltenbrunner, Andreas (2014). "Emotions under Discussion: Gender, Status and Communication in Online Collaboration". PLOS ONE. 9 (8) e104880. Bibcode:2014PLoSO...9j4880I. doi:10.1371/journal.pone.0104880. PMC 4139304. PMID 25140870.
- Fuster Morell, Mayo (1 February 2013). "Good Faith Collaboration: The Culture of Wikipedia". Information, Communication & Society. 16 (1): 146–147. doi:10.1080/1369118X.2011.602092. S2CID 144537283.
- Fuster Morell, Mayo (2012). "The Free Culture and 15M Movements in Spain: Composition, Social Networks and Synergies". Social Movement Studies. 11 (3–4): 386–392. doi:10.1080/14742837.2012.710323. S2CID 143037369.
- Fuster Morell, Mayo; Subirats, J. (2012). "Crisis de representación y de participación. ¿son las comunidades virtuales nuevas formas de agregación y participación ciudadana?". Arbor (in Spanish). 188 (756): 641–656. doi:10.3989/arbor.2012.756n4002. hdl:2072/409511.
- Morell, Mayo Fuster (2011). "The Unethics of Sharing: Wikiwashing". International Review of Information Ethics. 15 (Special issue: Ethics of Sharing). SSRN 2842693.
- Fuster Morell, Mayo (2010). Governance of Online Creation Communities: Provision of infrastructure for the building of digital commons (PhD thesis). European University Institute. SSRN 2842586.
- Morell, Mayo Fuster (2010). "Participation in Online Creation Communities: Ecosystemic Participation". Conference Proceedings of JITP 2010: The Politics of Open Source. Vol. 1. pp. 270–295.
- Wainwright, Hilary; Berlinguer, Marco; Fuster Morell, Mayo; Subirats, J. (2007). Networked Politics: An inquiry into rethinking political organization in an age of movements and networks. hdl:1814/7495. ISBN 978-90-71007-17-0.

== See also ==
- 15-M Movement
- Commons-based peer production
