= Nanda Rea =

Italian astrophysicist

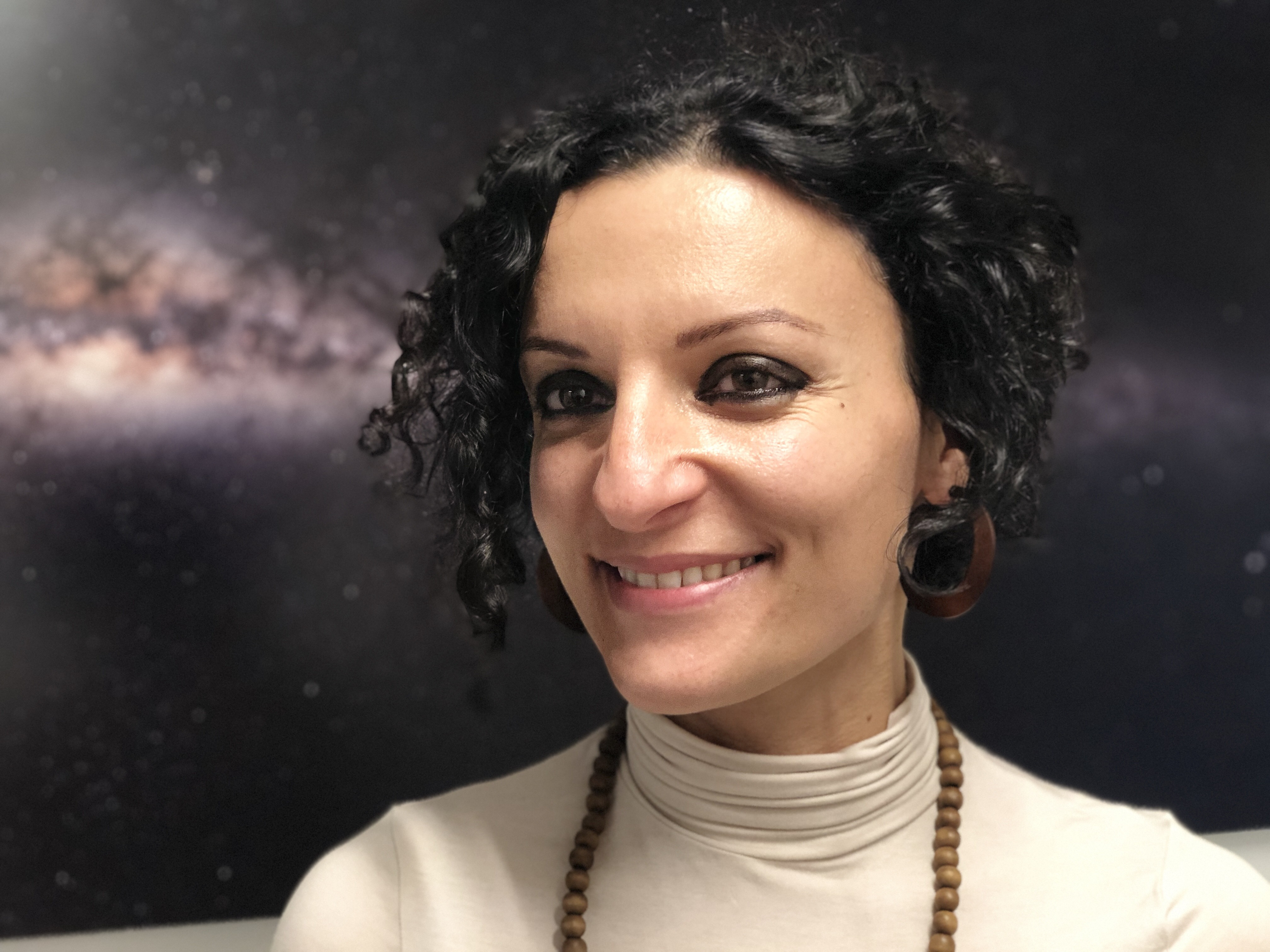
- Born: Rome, Italy
- Education: University of Rome Tor Vergata (BA and MSc); National Italian Institute for Astrophysics and Netherlands Institute for Space Research (PhD)
- Known for: High energy astrophysics Galactic compact objects Neutron stars and black holes Pulsars, Magnetars
- Children: 3
- Awards: Cavaliere dell'Ordine della Stella d'Italia (2021)
- Scientific career
- Fields: Physics, astrophysics
- Workplaces: Consejo Superior de Investigaciones Científicas

Nanda Rea is a scientist in the field of astrophysics, currently based in Barcelona, Spain working as a research professor for the Consejo Superior de Investigaciones Científicas and Institut d'Estudis Espacials de Catalunya.

== Education and career ==
Nanda Rea studied Physics at the University of Rome Tor Vergata, and specialised in Astrophysics at the end of her Master studies. In 2004, while pursuing her PhD at the National Italian Institute for Astrophysics (INAF), she moved to The Netherlands with an EU Marie Curie fellowship, aimed at training young students to mobility within Europe. She joined the Netherlands Institute for Space Research (SRON) where she graduated and then continued working until 2007. Thanks to an NWO VENI Fellowship she worked at the University of Amsterdam until 2009, when moved to Spain with a Ramón y Cajal Fellowship. Between 2012 and 2016 she moved back to The Netherlands as a Research Group Leader at the University of Amsterdam with a VIDI NWO Award. Since 2016 she is a staff scientist at the Consejo Superior de Investigaciones Científicas (CSIC), and since mid-2022 she is Full Professor at CSIC. She has a large group founded by an H2020 European Research Council Consolidator Grant, and recently received an ERC Proof of Concept grant (DeepSpacePulse) aimed at assessing the feasibility of an X-ray Pulsar Navigation system.

== Awards and recognition ==
- First Prize for Science in Action for the short film "Pulsars: A Tale of Cosmic Clocks" (2022)
- Knight of the Order of the Star of Italy (2021)
- Award for Science and Engineer from Banco Sabadell Foundation (2020)
- Award from the Spanish Royal Academy of Sciences for female scientists in Physics and Chemistry (2019)
- National Catalan Award for Young Scientific Researchers (2017)
- International Union of Pure and Applied Physics Young Scientist Prize for Astrophysics (2014)
- Zeldovich Medal from COSPAR and Russian Academy of Science (2014)

== Selected publications ==
- "The NewAthena mission concept in the context of the next decade of X-ray astronomy" - The Athena SRDT Team, 2024, Nature Astronomy
- "The X-ray mysteries of neutron stars and white dwarfs" - Nanda Rea & Norbert Schartel, 2024, Nature Astronomy
- "Neutron-star measurements in the multi-messenger Era" - Stefano Ascenzi, Vanessa Graber & Nanda Rea, 2024, Astroparticle Physics invited review
- "Fifty years of pulsar astrophysics" – Rea N., 2017, Nature Astronomy (CSIC Press Release)
- "Magnetar-like activity from the Central Compact Object in the SNR RCW103" – Rea N., Borghese A., Esposito P., et al. 2016, The Astrophysical Journal Letters (NASA Press Release)
- "Neutron stars hidden nuclear pasta" – Rea N. 2015, Physics Today
- "A strongly magnetized pulsar within the grasp of the Milky Way's supermassive black hole" – Rea N., Esposito P., Pons J. A., et al. 2013, The Astrophysical Journal Letters (NASA Press Releases)
- "A low-magnetic field Soft Gamma Repeater" – Rea N., Esposito P., Turolla R. et al. 2010, Science (ESA Press Release, NASA Press Releases)
- "Resonant cyclotron scattering in magnetars' emission – Rea N., Zane S., Turolla R., Lyutikov M. & Gotz D. 2008, The Astrophysical Journal (ESA Press Release)

== Memberships ==
- European Space Agency Einstein Probe Team (2024–present)
- European Space Agency NewAthena Science Study Team (2024–present)
- European Southern Observatory Expanding Horizons Senior Science Committee (2024–present)
- IAU Division D Steering Committee (2021–present)
- European Space Agency Astronomy Working Group (2018–2020)
- Square Kilometre Array (SKA) Transient and Pulsars working groups (2018–present)
- COST PHAROS Action Chair (2017–2023)
- Gran Telescopio Canarias (GTC) Users Committee (2012–2014)
