= Carlota Escutia Dotti =

Spanish geologist (born 1959)

- Education: MSc Autonomous University of Barcelona; PhD University of Barcelona
- Scientific career
- Fields: Geology
- Workplaces: Andalusian Earth Science Institute; High Council for Scientific Research (CSIC)

Carlota Escutia Dotti (born 1959) is a Spanish geologist, best known for her work on the geologic evolution of Antarctica and the global role of the Antarctic ice cap. Escutia is based at the Instituto Andaluz de Ciencias de la Tierra (Andalusian Institute of Earth Sciences), Universidad de Granada and the High Council for Scientific Research (CSIC).

== Early life and education ==
Carlota Escutia Dotti was born in Monzón (Huesca), Spain in 1959. Escutia received her undergraduate degree, followed by an MSc in Geology from the Autonomous University of Barcelona in 1982 and 1985 respectively. Her PhD was awarded in 1992 from the University of Barcelona in seismic stratigraphy and sedimentology in depositional environments.

== Career and impact ==
Escutia's research focuses on seismic stratigraphy and sedimentology of clastic continental margins in high and low latitudes with the following themes: global environmental and paleoclimatic change, geohazards, and resource assessment. She has made important contributions to understanding how the Antarctic ice sheet has grown and melted during the last 35 million years, also providing crucial information on the sedimentological record of climate change in Antarctica. In addition to her scientific publications, Escutia additionally has authored scientific and planning reports, as well as giving keynote and plenary lectures.

In her professional career she has worked as a marine geologist at the High Council for Scientific Research (CSIC), Instituto de Ciencias del Mar, Barcelona (Spain), from 1984 to 1985, as a visiting scholar to Stanford University, from 1994 to 1995, as a postdoctoral researcher at the United States Geological Survey, from 1995 to 1997, as a visiting scientist to the United States Geological Survey, from 1997 to 1998, as an adjunct professor at the California State University, from 1996 to 2002, as an assistant research scientist /Leg Project Manager at the Ocean Drilling Program-Texas A&M University, as a research affiliate at Texas A&M University, from 2001 to 2002, and as an investigator on "Ramón y Cajal" at the High Council for Scientific Research, from 2002 to 2005. She was Coordinator of the ANTOSTRAT (Antarctic Acoustic Offshore Stratigraphy) Project Land Regional Working Group, from 1995 to 2002, and European co-chief scientist of the Integrated Ocean Drilling Program (IODP) Expedition 318: Ice Sheet Evolution, collecting deep-sea cores off Wilkes Land in Antarctica from 2008–2013, she has contributed significantly to understanding the geologic evolution of Antarctica and the role of the Antarctic ice cap in our world.

Further projects cover the topics of marine-terrestrial linkages during past global climatic changes (2004-2005), Antarctic Climate Evolution (ACE): An International research initiative to study the climate and glacial history of Antarctica through paleoclimate and ice-sheet modelling integrated with the geological record for SCAR (2004–present), Antarctic Climate Evolution during the International Polar Year, Bipolar Climate Machinery - A study of the interplay of northern and southern polar processes in driving and amplifying global climate as recorded in paleoclimate archives and their significance for the generation of realistic estimates of future climate and sea level development during the International Polar Year and Plate Tectonics and Polar Gateways in Earth History during the International Polar Year.

She has been a member of the Joint Oceanographic Institutions for Deep Earth Sampling-Antarctic Detailed Planning Group since 1996, the chair of the Extreme Climates Working Group, APLACON (Alternate Platforms as part of the Integrated Ocean Drilling Program), Lisbon since 2001, was the Texas A&M-Ocean Drilling Program (ODP) liaison to the ODP Environmental Scientific Evaluation Panel from 1999 to 2002, is part of the JEODI Work Package-7 Working Group from September 2002 – present, currently serves on the Editorial Review Board (ERB) of the Ocean Drilling Program (1998–Present), a member of the Integrated Ocean Drilling Program (IODP) Site Survey Panel (SSP) in representation of the European Consortium for Ocean and a member of Research Drilling (ECORD) (2002-2005,) a member of the American Geophysical Union (AGU) from 1998–present, a member of the Society for Sedimentary Geology (SEPM) from 1998–present.

At the 2014 Scientific Committee on Antarctic Research Open Science Conference she was invited to give a plenary lecture on Deciphering past climate and ice sheet dynamics from sedimentary records. She was co-chief Officer and member of the steering committee of the SCAR Scientific Research Programme (SRP) Past Antarctic Ice Sheet Dynamics, is a member of Antarctic Climate Change in the 21st Century, and is one of the Spanish representatives to the SCAR Standing Scientific Group on Geosciences. Escutia also attended the SCAR Horizon Scan Retreat. Since 2005 she has been an associate research scientist at the High Council for Scientific Research, while also working as an academic in the doctoral programme ('Mención de Calidad') at the University of Granada. She has also been a collaborator, member or Principal Investigator on numerous scientific programmes and investigations.

== Awards ==
Elected member of the Spanish Royal Academy of Sciences-Real Academia de Ciencias Exactas, Físicas y Naturales (RAC) (2025) https://rac.es/noticias/403/

Elected National Correspondent of the Royal Academy of Sciences and Arts of Barcelona (2023) https://www.racab.cat/academia/academics/academics-en-2/national-correspondent/escutia/?lang=en

Rei Jaume I Award in Environmental Protection. Fundación Reinas Jaume I Awards (2023) https://fprj.es/premiados/

Scientific Committee on Antarctic Research (SCAR) Medal for International Scientific Coordination (2020): www.scar.org/awards/medals/awardees

Geological Society of America (GSA) Honorary Fellow (2020): www.geosociety.org/GSA/About/awards/GSA/Awards/2020/gsa-awards.aspx

Blaustein Fellowship from the School of Earth Sciences at Stanford University (California, USA) in 2009.
