= The Steamboat Institute =

Think tank in Steamboat Springs, Colorado

- Steamboat Institute logo
- Motto: Inspiring Americans to Greatness
- Founders: Rick Schubert-Akin, Jennifer Schubert-Akin
- Established: 2008; 18 years ago
- Mission: Promote America's first principles and inspire active involvement in the defense of liberty
- CEO: Jennifer Schubert-Akin
- Budget: $2.1 million (2024)
- Slogan: Defenders of Freedom and Advocates of Liberty
- Address: P.O. Box 776049
- Location: Steamboat Springs, Colorado 80477, US
- Website: steamboatinstitute.org

The Steamboat Institute is a conservative 501(c)(3) nonprofit educational institution located in Steamboat Springs, Colorado. It was founded in 2008 by Rick and Jennifer Schubert-Akin. The organization's stated mission is to "promote America's first principles and inspire active involvement in the defense of liberty." Among its stated principles are individual rights and responsibilities, limited taxation and fiscal responsibility, free market capitalism, limited government, and a strong national defense. The Steamboat Institute sponsors an annual conference. Speakers have included former United States Secretary of the Interior Ryan Zinke. The organization also awards an annual journalism fellowship named in honor of Tony Blankley.
