= Optical Materials Express =

- Discipline: Optics, photonics, materials science
- Language: English
- Edited by: Andrea Alù

Publication details
- History: 2011–present
- Publisher: Optica
- Frequency: Monthly
- Open access: Yes
- Impact factor: 2.6 (2025)

Standard abbreviations
- ISO 4: Opt. Mater. Express

Indexing
- CODEN: OMEPAX
- ISSN: 2159-3930
- LCCN: 2011201829
- OCLC no.: 696022710

Links
- Journal homepage; Online access; Online archive

Optical Materials Express is a monthly peer-reviewed and open access scientific journal published by Optica. Founded in 2011, it covers advances in and applications of optical materials, including but not limited to nonlinear optical materials, laser media, nanomaterials, metamaterials and biomaterials. Its editor-in-chief is Andrea Alù (City University of New York). The founding editor-in-chief was David J. Hagan.

== Abstracting and indexing ==
The journal is abstracted and indexed in:

- Current Contents/Engineering, Computing & Technology
- Current Contents/Physical, Chemical & Earth Sciences
- Directory of Open Access Journals
- Ei Compendex
- Inspec
- Science Citation Index Expanded
- Scopus

According to the Journal Citation Reports, the journal has a 2025 impact factor of 2.6.
