= Geochicas =

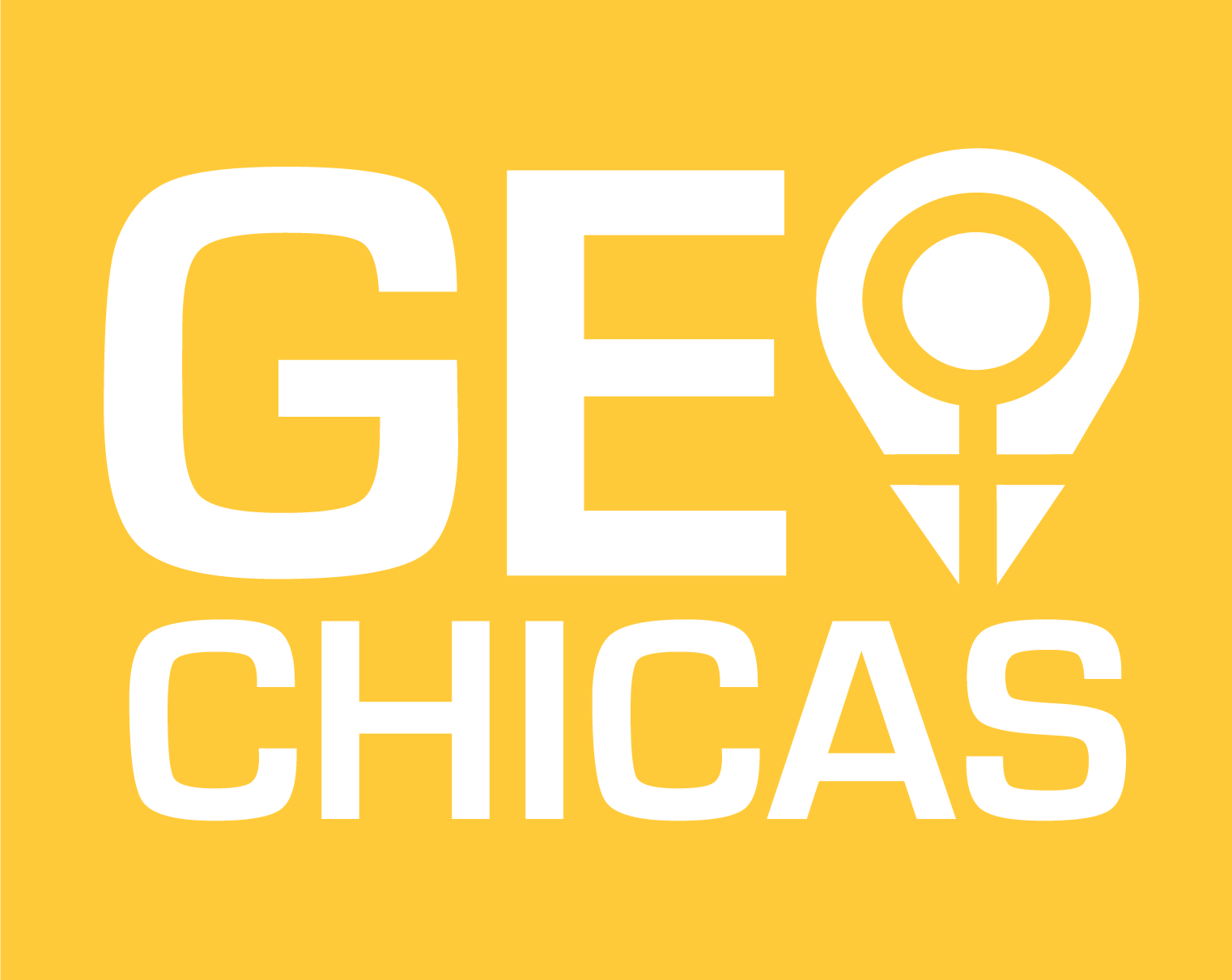
- Formation: 2016
- Website: https://wiki.openstreetmap.org/wiki/ES:GeoChicas

Geochicas is a collective of feminists linked to OpenStreetMap, originally Spanish-speaking, who work for female empowerment and reducing the gender gap in the OpenStreetMap communities and communities associated with the world of free software and open data. Geochicas today has users on at least 3 continents.

The thematic areas of Geochicas are:

- The fight against gender violence against women and girls
- Women's health care
- The visibility of feminist mobilizations
- The understanding of leadership mechanisms and their brakes in the collective dimension.

== History ==
Geochicas was born in 2016, days before the annual OpenStreetMap State of the Map LatAm 2016 conference, in São Paulo, Brazil, with the aim of discussing in a panel that would be proposed as a permanent activity, the causes and implications of the low participation of women in the construction of the map. The conclusions of this panel and forum with the total number of attendees allowed us to build the initial agenda of Geochicas, and link the first members.

The idea arose from three participants, Miriam González, Selene Yang and Céline Jacquin, who with this purpose participated in the organization of activities at SOTM in São Paulo. They organized a previous meeting between women attendees to talk about the problems they face as women in their geodate community and find out their interest in forming a network or collective. A panel was held at the close of the conference where the problematic issues of the gender gap in OpenStreetMap were raised, and the mixed group of the community present was discussed about the implications for a map so important for all types of decision-making in the world. The first lines of a work agenda were designed as conclusions of the panel and a communication channel was created integrating the interested women present. The popularity of this event led to the creation in the form of a collective focused on looking at the map of Latin America and the world, through a feminist lens.

== Projects ==
In 2016 and 2017, the Geochicas created maps of both the oncology clinics in Nicaragua and the femicides in that country. During those same years they created visibility campaigns on Twitter with the hashtag "#MujeresMapeandoElMundo", the "International Gender Representation Survey" on OpenStreetMap.

In 2018 they created a virtual map to make visible the lack of representation of women's names on the streets of cities in Latin America and Spain.

A HOTOSM subgrant was obtained to collect field information in the Oaxaca region (Mexico) affected by the 2017 earthquakes through a journey through 20 towns, carrying out photo-mapping with Mapillary and interviewing women.

The horizontal training strategy "Training Spaces" was promoted with a series of community webinars on technology and data science training.

In 2019, an internal working group was started, based in Mexico, on femicidal violence. resulting in a rapprochement with the Geobrujas collective. For International Women's Day, a regional Editathon + Mapathon was promoted to collect data on health infrastructure for women.

A global collaborative map of the performances of "Un Violador En Tu Camino" was made inspired by the initiative of the Las Tesis collective. This proposal was extended in the mapping of mobilizations for International Women's Day in 2020.
