= Galaxy And Mass Assembly survey =

Astronomical survey

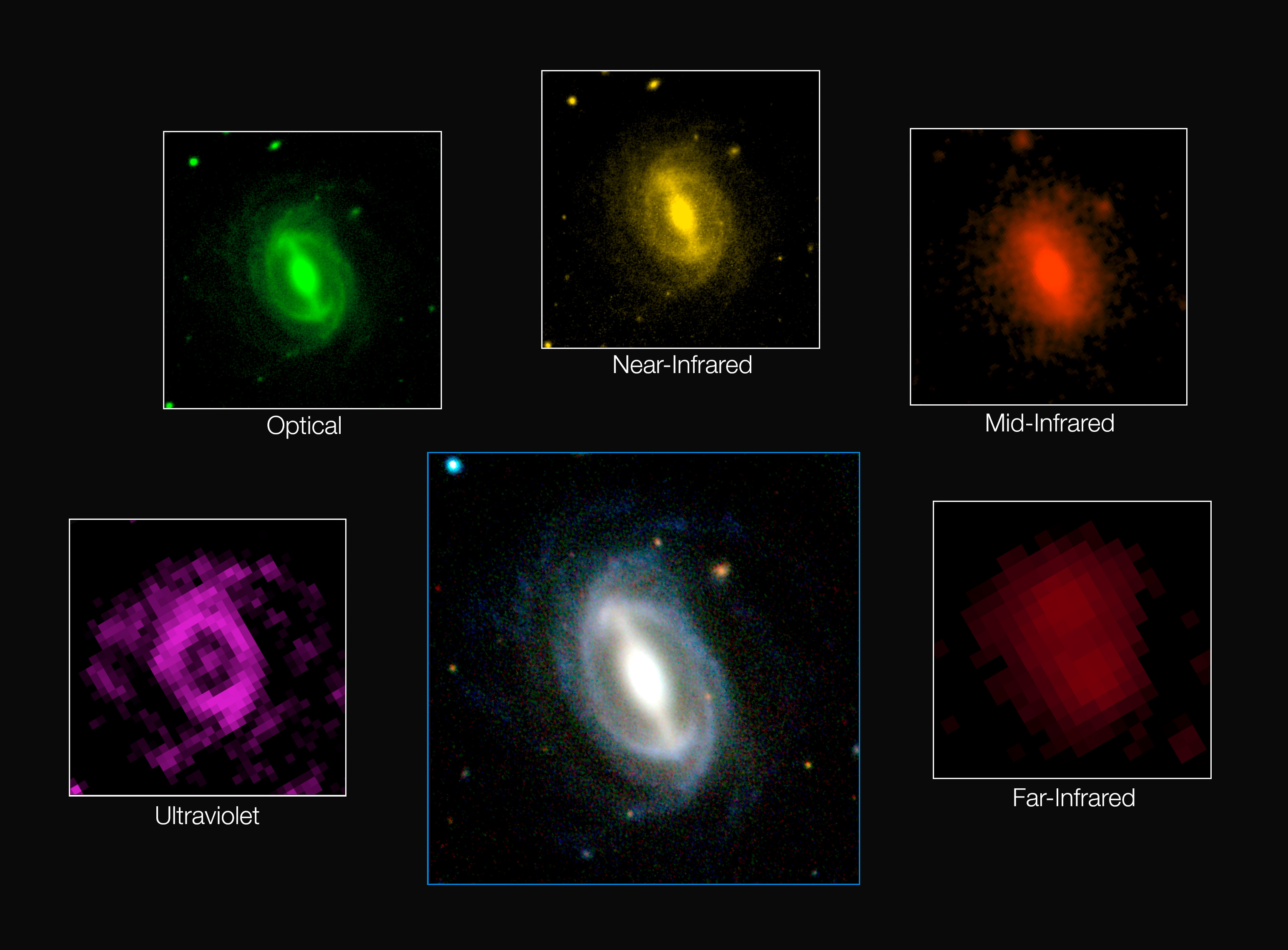
- Composite picture shows how a typical galaxy appears at different wavelengths in the GAMA survey
- Website: www.gama-survey.org
- Related media on Commons

This simulated flythrough shows the real positions and images of the galaxies that have been mapped so far. Distances are to scale, but the galaxy images have been enlarged for your viewing pleasure.

The Galaxy And Mass Assembly (GAMA) survey is a project that plans to exploit the latest generation of ground-based wide-field survey facilities to study cosmology and galaxy formation and evolution. GAMA plans to bring together data from a number of world class instruments:

- The Anglo-Australian Telescope (AAT),
- The VLT Survey Telescope (VST)
- The Visible and Infrared Survey Telescope for Astronomy (VISTA)
- The Australian Square Kilometre Array Pathfinder (ASKAP)
- The Herschel Space Observatory
- The Galaxy Evolution Explorer (GALEX)

Data from these instruments will be used to construct a state-of-the-art multi-wavelength database of ~375,000 galaxies in the local Universe over a 360 deg^{2} region of sky, based on a spectroscopic redshift survey on the AAT's AAOmega spectrograph.

The main objective of GAMA is to study structure on scales of 1 kpc to 1 Mpc. This includes galaxy clusters, groups, mergers and coarse measurements of galaxy structure (i.e., bulges and discs). It is on these scales where baryons play a critical role in the galaxy formation and subsequent evolutionary processes and where our understanding of structure in the Universe breaks down.

GAMA's primary goal is to test the CDM paradigm of structure formation. In particular, the key scientific objectives are:

- A measurement of the dark matter halo mass function of groups and clusters using group velocity dispersion measurements.
- A comprehensive determination of the galaxy stellar mass function to Magellanic Cloud masses to constrain baryonic feedback processes.
- A direct measurement of the recent galaxy merger rates as a function of mass, mass ratio, local environment and galaxy type.

In August 2012 GAMA received worldwide attention for its announcement of a galaxy system very similar to our own Milky-Way Magellanic Cloud system, centred on GAMA202627.

== See also ==
- Lambda-CDM model (ΛCDM)
- Halo mass function
