= Sergey Bozhevolnyi =

Danish physicist

Sergey I. Bozhevolnyi
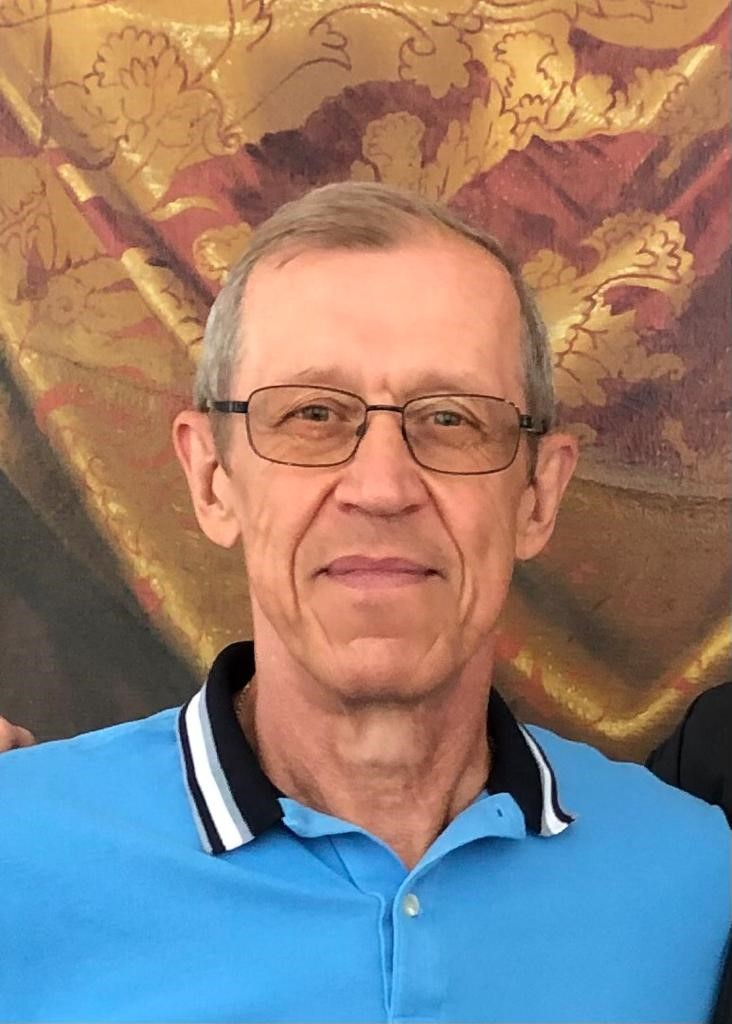
- Born: June 19, 1955 (age 71); Krasnodar Krai, USSR
- Citizenship: Danish
- Education: Moscow Institute of Physics and Technology
- Scientific career
- Fields: Nano-optics; Plasmonics; Metamaterials; Quantum optics
- Workplaces: University of Southern Denmark
- Website: www.sdu.dk/nano-optics

Sergey I. Bozhevolnyi (Russian: Сергей Иосифович Божевольный, born June 19, 1955) is a Russian-Danish physicist. He is currently a professor and the leader for the Centre for Nano Optics at the University of Southern Denmark.

== Education and career ==
Bozhevolnyi was raised in the village of Kopanskaya, Yeysky District, Krasnodar Krai, USSR and grew up in a family of teachers of physics and mathematics. In 1978 he graduated from Moscow Institute of Physics and Technology with a Master of Science degree in physics. In 1981, he earned a PhD-degree from the same university with the thesis entitled "Study of electro-optical modulators and deflectors based on diffuse waveguides in LiNbO₃". In 1998, he earned a Doctor of Science Degree at Aarhus University, Denmark, with his thesis entitled "Subwavelength apertureless light confinement".

- 1981–1989 Lecturer, Senior Lecturer, Associate Professor of the Yaroslavl State Technical University, Russia
- 1990–1991 Head of Section of Optical Technologies, Institute of Microelectronics, Russian Academy of Sciences, Yaroslavl, Russia
- 1987, 1991 — visiting scientist, since 1992 lecturer and associate professor, since 2003 full professor at the Department of Physics and Nanotechnology, Aalborg University, Denmark
- 1998–2001 Lecturer at the Center for Microelectronics, Technical University of Denmark, Denmark
- 2001–2004 Chief Technical Officer, Micro Managed Photons A / S, Denmark
- since 2008 Professor of nano-optics, since 2013 head of the Center for Nano Optics at the University of Southern Denmark, Odense, Denmark

In 2006, together with professor Alexander Tishchenko at Jean Monnet University, he founded the Laboratory of Nano-Optics and Plasmonics in Moscow Institute of Physics and Technology

Since 2017, Bozhevolnyi is on the list of the most Highly Cited Researchers ( Clarivate / Thomson-Reuters).

== Publications ==
Professor Bozhevolnyi has authored and co-authored more than 620 peer-reviewed articles with 15 patents and 14 book chapters. His h-index was 90 (Web of Science) and 107 (Google Scholar) as of November 13, 2026.

== Awards ==
- 2007 Elected Fellow of the Optical Society of America for his "pioneering contributions to near-field optics and plasmonics, including nonlinear phenomena and surface plasmon localization and guiding in nanostructures."
- 2009 Best Scientist of the year from the Danish newspaper "Fyens Stiftstidendes Forskerpris"
- 2011 Selected as a member of the Danish Academy of Natural Sciences (DNA)
- 2019 Villum Kann-Rasmussen Prize (for outstanding contributions to the development of technical and natural sciences)
- 2019 Danish Optical Society Senior Award (for outstanding contribution to near-field optics and fundamental efforts in the development of nano-optics in Denmark, 2019)
- 2019 Selected as a member of the Danish Academy of Technical Sciences (ATV)
- 2020 Recipient of the EPS-QEOD Prize for "Research in Laser Science and Applications" (for seminal contributions to surface-plasmon polaritons and the developments of plasmonic metasurfaces)
- 2024 Knighted in Order of the Dannebrog by His Majesty the King on October 23, 2024
