= Lara (name) =

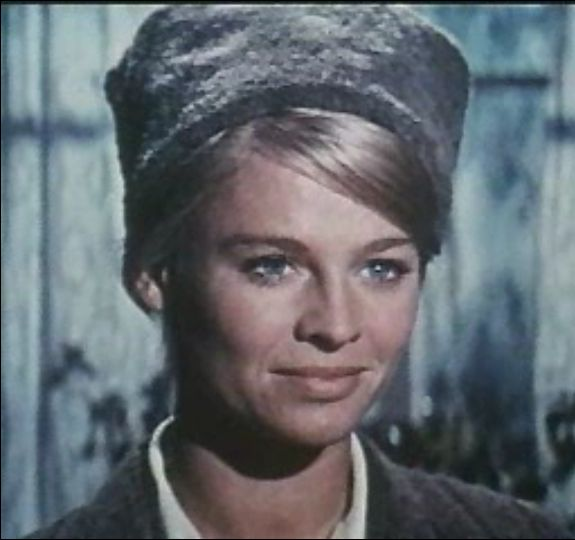
- Actress Julie Christie portrayed Lara Antipova in the 1965 film Dr. Zhivago.
- Pronunciation: English: /ˈlɑːrə/ LAH-rə; Russian: [ˈɫarə]
- Gender: Female
- Language: Greek, Latin, Russian

Origin
- Meaning: Russian short form of Larissa

Other names
- Related names: Larisa, Larissa

Lara is a feminine given name or a surname in several languages. It can be used as a short form of the name Larissa. It was popularized in the Anglosphere by a character in the 1965 film Dr. Zhivago.

Lara is also a water nymph in Roman Mythology who is the mother of the Lares. The name is of uncertain etymology.

The name has been among the top 1,000 names used for newborn girls in the United States since 1966, the year after the film Dr. Zhivago debuted. The name has also seen wide use in Australia, Canada, Ireland, the United Kingdom, and across Europe.

== Given name ==
- Lara Abdallat (born 1982), Jordanian hacker
- Lara Aharonian (born 1972), Armenian Canadian human rights activist
- Lara Aknin, Canadian social psychologist
- Lara Alcock, British mathematics educator
- Lara Amersey (born 1984), Canadian actress
- Lara Arruabarrena (born 1992), Spanish tennis player
- Lara-B (born 1979), Slovenian singer
- Lara Baars (born 1996), Dutch athlete
- Lara Baladi (born 1969), Egyptian-Lebanese photographer
- Lara Barbieri (born 1986), Italian football player
- Lara Belmont (born 1980), English actress
- Lara Berman (born 1980), Israeli correspondent
- Lara Bianconi (born 1974), Italian swimmer
- Lara Bird (born 1998), Scottish politician
- Lara Bitter (born 1975), Dutch tennis player
- Lara Flynn Boyle (born 1970), American actress
- Lara Breay, British film producer
- Lara Briden (born 1969), author
- Lara Brown, American political scientist
- Lara Butler (born 1994), Caymanian swimmer
- Lara Cardella (born 1969), Italian writer
- Lara Carroll (born 1986), English swimmer
- Lara Casanova (born 1996), Swiss snowboarder
- Lara Cazalet (born 1973), English actress
- Lara Habib Chamat (born 1980), Lebanese news presenter
- Lara Jean Chorostecki (born 1984), Canadian actress
- Lara Christen (born 2002), Swiss ice hockey player
- Lara Petusky Coger (born 1970), American journalist
- Lara Comi (born 1983), Italian politician
- Lara Cox (born 1978), Australian actress
- Lara Davenport (born 1983), Australian Olympic athlete
- Lara Hedberg Deam (born 1967), American publisher
- Lara Cosima Henckel von Donnersmarck (born 2003), German social media influencer
- Lara Debbana (born 1994), Egyptian model
- Lara Defour (born 1997), Belgian professional racing cyclist
- Lara Denis (born 1969), American philosopher
- Lara Dickenmann (born 1985), Swiss footballer
- Lara Elena Donnelly (born 1990), American author
- Lara Dunkley (born 1995), Australian netball player
- Lara Dutta (born 1978), Indian actress
- Lara Escauriza (born 1998), Paraguayan tennis player
- Lara Escudero (born 1993), French ice hockey player
- Lara Fabian (born 1970), Belgian-Canadian singer
- Lara Falk (born 1997), Australian skier
- Lara Favaretto (born 1973), Italian artist
- Lara Fernandez (born 1996), Spanish kickboxer
- Lara Filocamo (born 1990), Australian rules footballer
- Lara George, Nigerian artist
- Lara Giddings (born 1972), Australian politician
- Lara Gilchrist (born 1982), Canadian actress
- Lara Gillespie (born 2001), Irish professional racing cyclist
- Lara Goodall (born 1996), South African cricketer
- Lara Goodison (born 1989), English actress
- Lara González (rhythmic gymnast) (born 1986), Spanish rhythmic gymnast
- Lara Grangeon (born 1991), French swimmer
- Lara Grice (born 1971), American actress
- Lara Gut-Behrami (born 1991), Swiss alpine ski racer
- Lara Naki Gutmann (born 2002), Italian figure skater
- Lara Harris (born 1962), American model
- Lara Heinz (born 1981), Luxembourgian swimmer
- Lara Hoffmann (born 1991), German Olympic athlete
- Lara Honrado, Canadian politician
- Lara Hooiveld (born 1971), Australian swimmer
- Lara Ivanuša (born 1997), Slovenian footballer
- Lara Jackson (born 1986), American freestyle swimmer
- Lara Jakes (born 1973), American journalist
- Lara St. John (born 1971), Canadian violinist
- Lara Jones (1975–2010), British artist
- Lara Käpplein (born 1995), German badminton player
- Lara Keller (born 1991), Swiss football striker
- Lara Kipp (born 2002), Austrian luger
- Lara Klaes (born 1997), German politician
- Lara Knutson (born 1974), American artist
- Lara Kramer, Canadian dancer
- Lara Lallemant (born 2004), French cyclist
- Lara Landon (born 1985), American musician
- Lara Lewington (born 1979), British television presenter
- Lara Logan (born 1971), American television journalist for CBS News
- Lara Magoni (born 1969), Italian alpine skier and politician
- Lara Mahal, American professor
- Lara Maigue (born 1991), Filipino singer
- Lara Maiklem (born 1971), British author
- Lara Malsiner (born 2000), Italian ski jumper
- Lara Mandić (born 1974), Serbian basketball player
- Lara Maritz (born 2001), Irish cricketer
- Lara Marlowe (born 1957), American journalist
- Lara Jean Marshall (born 1988), Australian-English actress
- Lara Martin, English musician
- Lara Mazur, Canadian film editor
- Lara McAllen (born 1983), British vocalist
- Lara McDonnell (born 2003), Irish actress
- Lara McSpadden (born 1999), Australian basketball player
- Lara Della Mea (born 1999), Italian alpine ski racer
- Lara Melda (born 1993), Turkish pianist
- Lara Merrett (born 1971), Australian visual artist
- Lara Meyerratken, Australian instrumentalist
- Lara Michel (born 1991), Swiss tennis player
- Lara Jill Miller (born 1967), American actress
- Lara Molins (born 1980), Irish cricketer
- Lara Morgan (born 1967), British entrepreneur
- Lara Mori (born 1998), Italian artistic gymnast
- Lara Mullen (born 1994), British fashion model
- Lara Nalbantoğlu (born 2001), Turkish sport sailor
- Lara Nielsen (born 1992), Australian athlete
- Lara González Ortega (born 1992), Spanish handball player
- Lara Oviedo (born 1988), Argentine-Italian field hockey player
- Lara Pampín (born 1995), Spanish field hockey player
- Lara Parker (1938–2023), American television actress
- Lara Saint Paul (1945–2018), Eritrean-Italian singer
- Lara Pavlović (born 1998), Croatian handball player
- Lara Peake (born 1998), English actress
- Lara Petera (born 1978), New Zealand professional squash player
- Lara Peyrot (born 1975), Italian cross-country skier
- Lara Pitt (born 1981), Australian television presenter
- Lara Porzak (born 1967), American fine art photographer
- Lara Prašnikar (born 1998), Slovenian striker
- Lara Preacco (born 1971), Swiss swimmer
- Lara Prescott, American author
- Lara Prior-Palmer (born 1994), British writer and athlete
- Lara Pulver (born 1980), English actress
- Lara Rabal (born 1983), Spanish football player
- Lara Rae (born 1963), Canadian comedian
- Lara Jo Regan (born 1962), American photographer
- Lara-Isabelle Rentinck (born 1986), German film actress
- Lara Ricote (born 1996), Mexican comedian
- Lara Robinson (born 1998), Australian actress
- Lara Rodrigues (born 1990), Brazilian actress
- Lara Rose, British singer
- Lara Rossi, British actress
- Lara Roxx (born 1982), Canadian pornographic film actress
- Lara van Ruijven (1992–2020), Dutch short track speed skater
- Lara Juliette Sanders, German director
- Lara Sanders (born 1986), American-Turkish basketball player
- Lara Santana (born 1993), Brazilian politician
- Lara Mussell Savage, English athlete
- Lara Scandar (born 1990), Egyptian singer-songwriter
- Lara Schmidt (born 1999), German tennis player
- Lara Schnitger (born 1969), American-Dutch painter
- Lara Setrakian (born 1982), American journalist
- Lara Spencer (born 1969), American television presenter
- Lara Stalder (born 1994), Swiss ice hockey player
- Lara Stein (born 1966), American executive
- Lara Stock (born 1992), Croatian chess player
- Lara Stone (born 1983), Dutch fashion model
- Lara Sullivan (born 1969), Australian judoka
- Lara Taylor-Pearce, Sierra Leonean auditor general
- Lara Teeter (born 1955), American dancer
- Lara Teixeira (born 1987), Brazilian Olympic athlete
- Lara Trump (born 1982), American television producer
- Lara Vadlau (born 1994), Austrian sailor
- Lara Vapnyar (born 1971), American author
- Lara Veronin (born 1988), Taiwanese singer
- Lara Vieceli (born 1993), Italian racing cyclist
- Lara Villata (born 1967), Italian equestrian
- Lara Vukasović (born 1994), Croatian volleyball player
- Lara Wendel (born 1965), German actress
- Lara de Wit (born 1983), Australian pianist
- Lara Wolf (born 2000), Austrian freestyle skier
- Lara Wollington (born 2003), British actress
- Lara Wolters (born 1986), Dutch politician
- Lara Worthington (born 1987), Australian model
- Lara Yan (born 1991), Georgian model
- Lara Zara (born 1982), Assyrian politician

== Surname ==
=== Cultural origins ===
The Spanish surname Lara is derived from Lara de los Infantes, in the Burgos province of Spain, and in some cases retains the original form, de Lara ('of Lara'); there are also Lara surnames in France and Romania.

=== People with the surname ===
- Adelina de Lara (1872–1961), British pianist and composer
- Adriana Lara, Mexican computer scientist
- Agustín Lara (1900–1970), Mexican composer
- Alda Lara, Angolan poet
- Alexandra Maria Lara, Romanian actress
- Alonso Manrique de Lara, Spanish Roman Catholic prelate
- Antonio Lara de Gavilán, Spanish artist
- Antonio Lara Zárate (1881–1956), Spanish lawyer and politician
- Bernardo Gutiérrez de Lara, Mexican politician
- Blanca de La Cerda y Lara, Spanish noblewoman
- Brian Lara (born 1969), Trinidadian and West Indies cricketer
- Brigido Lara, Mexican artist
- Carlos Lara Bareiro, Paraguayan composer
- Catherine Lara, French violinist, composer and singer
- Cayo Lara (born 1952), Spanish politician
- Christian Lara, Ecuadorian footballer
- Christian Lara, Guadeloupean film director
- Claude Autant-Lara, French film director
- Daniel Lara, American internet celebrity
- Daniel García Lara, Spanish footballer
- David Laurent de Lara (c.1806–1876), Dutch illuminator
- Dona Ivone Lara (1922 – 2018), Brazilian singer and composer
- Edman Lara (born 1985), Bolivian politician and former police officer
- Eduardo Lara, Colombian football manager
- Emilio Lara (weightlifter), Cuban weightlifter
- Erislandy Lara, Cuban boxer
- Eurico Lara (1897–1935), Brazilian footballer
- Francisco José Lara, Spanish professional road bicycle racer
- Georgia Lara, Greek water polo player
- Guillermo Lara, Ecuadorian politician
- Isidore de Lara, English composer
- Jacinto Lara (1777–1859), Venezuelan independence leader
- Jami Porter Lara, American artist
- Jerónimo Manrique de Lara, Spanish Roman Catholic prelate
- Joe Lara, American actor and musician
- José Manuel Lara, Spanish golfer
- Juan Lara, Dominican baseball player
- Juan Jesús Vivas Lara, Spanish politician
- Joaquin Gallegos Lara, Ecuadorian writer and poet
- Kiki Lara, Mexican soccer player
- Louis, comte de Narbonne-Lara, French soldier and diplomat
- Lucas Martínez Lara, Mexican Roman Catholic prelate
- Lúcio Lara, Angolan politician
- Luisa María Lara (born 1966), Spanish astrophysicist
- María Teresa Lara, Mexican composer
- Maritza Lara-López, Mexican astronomer
- Martha Lara (fl. late 20th century), Mexican diplomat and politician
- Martín Acosta y Lara, Uruguayan basketball player
- Modesto Lara (born 1973), Dominican judoka
- Nil Lara, American musician
- Oruno Lara, Guadeloupean poet, author and historian
- Osvaldo Lara (born 1955), Cuban track and field sprinter
- Pablo Lara, Cuban weightlifter
- Rafael Paulo de Lara Araújo, Brazilian basketball player
- Raúl Lara (born 1973), Mexican soccer player
- Ricardo Lara, California politician
- Rodrigo Lara Bonilla, Colombian politician
- Rosalio José Castillo Lara, Venezuelan Roman Catholic prelate
- Saúl Lara, Bolivian politician
- Silvia Lara Povedano, Costa Rican politician and sociologist
- Tino de Lara, Filipino actor
- Tito Lara, Puerto Rican singer
- Willian Lara (1957–2010), Venezuelan politician
- Víctor Neumann-Lara, Mexican mathematician
- Marlon Guillermo Lara Orellana, Honduran politician
- Margrét Lára Viðarsdóttir, Icelandic footballer

== Fictional characters with the name ==
- Lara (DC Comics), the biological mother of the comic book character Superman
- Larissa "Lara" Antipova, heroine of Boris Pasternak's novel Doctor Zhivago (1957, played by Julie Christie in the 1965 film)
- Lara Božić, titular character of the Croatian television series Larin izbor (Lara's Choice)
- Lara Croft, main character from the Tomb Raider series
- Lara-Su, Knuckle's future daughter from the Sonic the Hedgehog comic series. She appears in the "Mobius 25 Years Later" storyline and in its sequel arc: "30 Years Later". Lara-Su is also the main protagonist in the upcoming Lara-Su Chronicles graphic novel series.
- Lara the Black Cat Fairy, a character in Rainbow Magic
- Lara Tybur, a character in the manga series Attack on Titan
- Lara Greyrat, character of ranobe "Mushoku_Tensei"

== Mythological characters with the name ==
- Lara (mythology), in Greek mythology, Lara is a Naiad nymph and daughter of the river Almo in Ovid's poem Fasti
- Lara, in ancient Egyptian mythology, means sun ray, coming from Ra, the god of sun.

== See also ==
- Lara (disambiguation)
