= Jacob Martin =

Jacob Martin may refer to:

- Jacob Martin (cricketer), Indian cricketer
- Jacob Martin (American football), American football outside linebacker
- Jacob Martin (politician), member of the Alabama legislature
- Jacob L. Martin, American diplomat

== See also ==
- Jakob Martin, American songwriter, performer, and recording artist.
