= Coger =

Coger is a surname. Notable people with the surname include:

- Claude Coger, American newspaper owner, namesake of Coger House in Arkansas
- Dalvan Coger, American professor of African Studies and Science Fiction fan, namesake of Darrell Awards Dal Coger Memorial Hall of Fame
- Emma Coger, 19th-century African-American teacher, plaintiff in discrimination case Coger v. The North Western Union Packet Co.
- Irene Coger, actor in American romance drama film Foxfire Light (1982)
- Lara Petusky Coger, American journalist and television producer
- Robin Coger, American biomedical engineer and academic administrator
- Tyrek Coger, American basketball player and adopted brother of Rodney Purvis, named to 2016–17 Oklahoma State Cowboys basketball team, collapsed and died in a workout before joining team

== See also ==
- Cogers, a British free speech society
- Cogger, another surname
