= Lara-López =

Lara-López is a Spanish compound surname. Notable people with the surname include:

- Adriana Lara López, Mexican computer scientist
- Luisa María Lara López (born 1966), Spanish astrophysicist
- Maritza Lara-López, Mexican astronomer
