= Kidskin =

Soft, thin leather often used for gloves

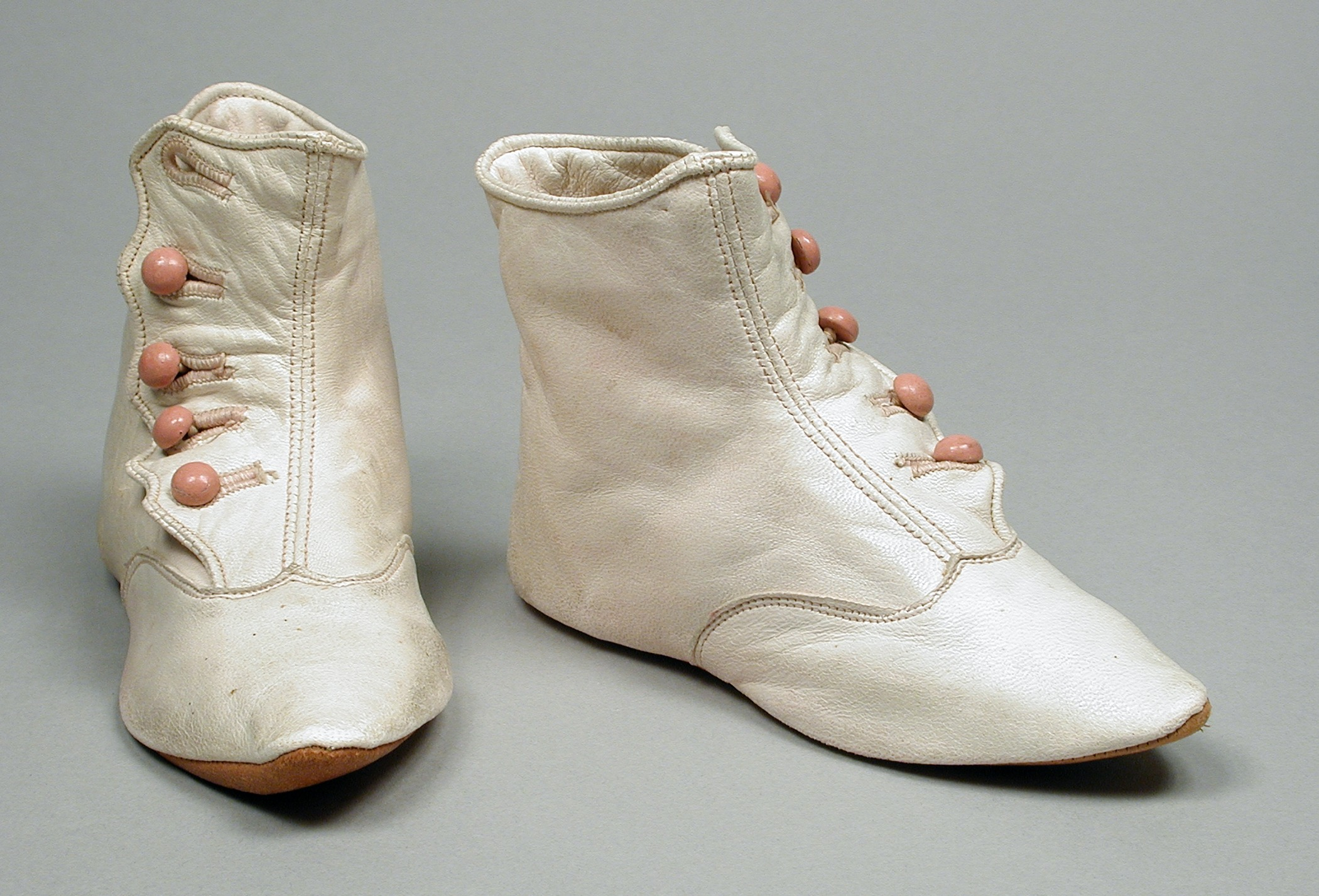
Pair of infant's kidskin boots, 1890s. LACMA, M.54.21.4a-b

Kidskin or kid leather is a type of soft, thin leather that is traditionally used for gloves (hence the phrase 'kid gloves,' used since at least 1888 as a metaphor for careful handling). It is widely used for other fashion purposes such as footwear and clothing. Kidskin is traditionally made from goatskin – more specifically, the skin of young goats (or 'kids'), although equivalent leathers such as lambskin and chickenskin (actually a form of calfskin) give the same effect.

== Usage ==
Kid leather is, and has been used for a number of purposes other than gloves and footwear. Early flexible hair rollers were sometimes made from kidskin, giving a very tight curl.

=== Papermaking ===
While vellum is often made using calfskin, kidskin can also be used and in some cases, was preferred. David Laurent de Lara, describing himself as illuminating artist to Queen Victoria, favoured Italian kid vellum for his work.

A form of early medieval parchment, called carta lustra, acting as tracing paper was made using kidskin.

=== Dolls ===
Kid was particularly widely used in doll-making during the nineteenth and early twentieth century as a popular material for both French and German doll bodies, particularly fashion dolls.

=== Musical instruments ===
Kid-leather is often used in the construction of musical instruments such as the bag of the tsampouna, a form of Greek bagpipes. It was also an option for drumheads such as those on tambourines, and specifically, on the Bulgarian daire. In the early days of woodwind instruments, it was used as padding for keys.

=== Industrial uses ===
The Dalén light, used in lighthouses, uses a paraffin-wax saturated kidskin diaphragm in its construction.

== Types ==
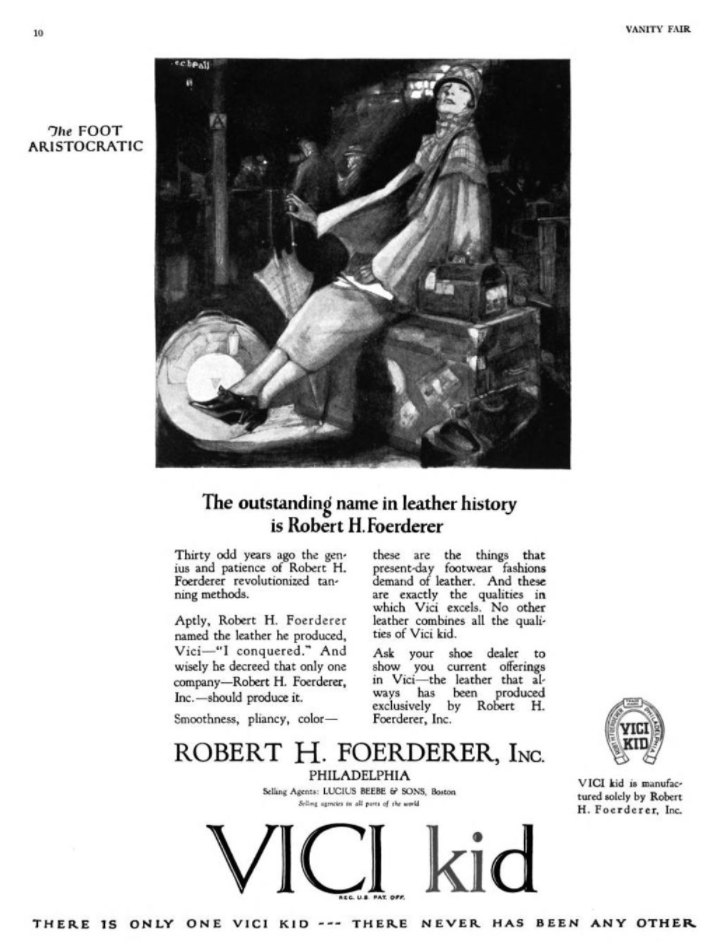
Vici kid advertisement in Vanity Fair, 1924

In 1916 it was noted that there were over sixty types of goatskin, distinguished by the tanning and finishing processes used. Some of these types are:

- Bronze kid - Cochineal-dyed for a bronzed finish.
- Cadet kid
- Cheveril - A very flexible kid leather used in the late 16th and early 17th centuries.
- Diphera - Mid-19th century type of fine kid used for bonnets.
- Dongola - Skin from the sheep, kangaroo or goat.
- French kid - A high quality kidskin.
- Glacé (or glazed) kid - Extremely glossy, shiny finish, often made in more readily available sheepskin, although true kidskin makes better quality glacé kid.
- Gold (or silver) kid - Kidskin gilded for a metallic finish.
- Kangaroo kid - Kidskin finished to emulate kangaroo leather.
- Mat kid - Beeswax and olive-oil treated kidskin with a dull, soft matte finish.
- Morocco
- Patent kid - japanned leather.
- Pebbled
- Royal kid
- Suede kid - Kidskin with a suede finish.
- Vici kid - A trademark for high quality chrome-tanned kidskin with a soap and oil finish, developed by Robert H. Foerderer in Philadelphia in the mid-1880s.
