= Klaes =

Klaes is a given name and surname. Notable people with the surname include:

- Klaes Karppinen (1907–1992), Finnish cross-country skier
- Lara Klaes (born 1997), German politician
- Ulrich Klaes (born 1946), German field hockey player

Fictional characters with the name include:

- Klaes Ashford, a character in The Expanse (TV series)
