= Lara Sanders =

Lara Sanders may refer to:

- LaToya Sanders or Lara Sanders (born 1986), American-Turkish basketball player
- Lara Juliette Sanders, German director, producer and TV personality
