= Cogger =

Cogger is a surname. Notable people with the surname include:

- Gerald Cogger (1933–2019), English cricketer
- Harold Cogger (born 1935), Australian herpetologist
- Jack Cogger (born 1997), Australian professional rugby league footballer, son of Trevor
- Michel Cogger (1939–2025), Québécois businessman, lawyer, and Canadian Senator
- Naomi Cogger, New Zealand professor of epidemiology
- Trevor Cogger (born 1961), Australian professional rugby league footballer, father of Jack

== See also ==
- Coger, surname
