= Adelina de Lara =

British classical pianist and composer

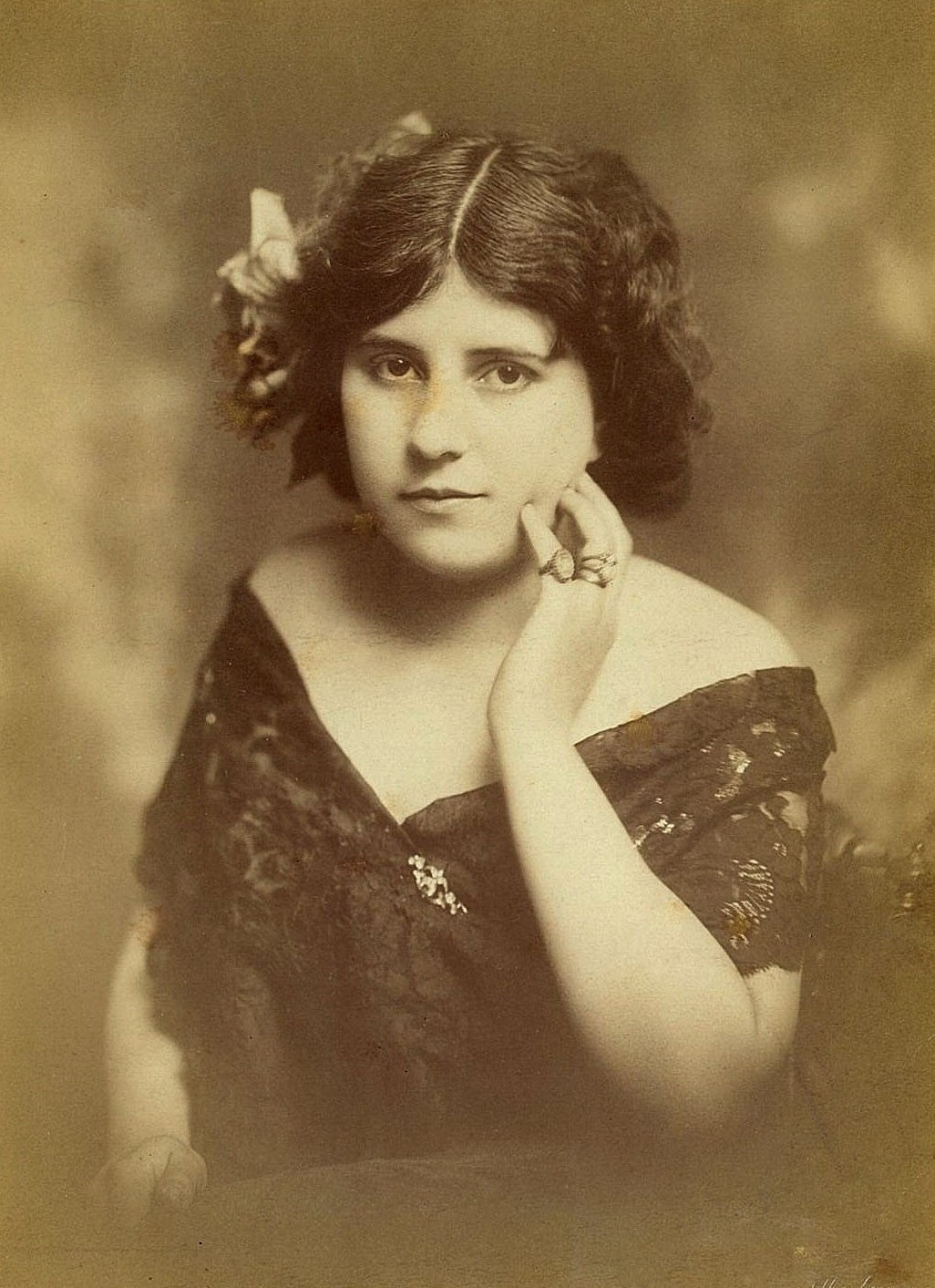
Adelina de Lara (1900)

Adelina de Lara OBE (23 January 1872 – 25 November 1961) was a British classical pianist and composer.

== Early life ==
She was born Lottie Adelina Preston in Carlisle, Cumberland on 23 January 1872 to parents George Matthew Tilbury (aka Preston) of Southampton and Anna de Lara. Her grandfather was David Laurent de Lara, a Dutch-born illuminator, who, according to Adelina de Lara, was the son of the Spanish Count Laurent de Lara. Her mother was the sister-in-law of Sir Landon Ronald. She was given the performing name of Adelina de Lara after a visit to a music shop with her father, to secure her first engagement. The music shop proprietor considered the name Adelina Preston far too ‘English’ to perform under and thus suggested her mother's maiden name as a suitable replacement. She first appeared in public at the age of six, and gave recitals throughout the UK until the age of twelve.

== Career ==
She was educated at the Hoch Conservatory in Frankfurt under Iwan Knorr, and studied piano with Fanny Davies and Clara Schumann, whose work she championed for most of her life. She was close friends with Johannes Brahms through her studies. As an adult, Adelina de Lara performed in public for the first time following her studies in 1891 and continued for over seventy years, making her final appearance on 15 June 1954 at the Wigmore Hall London. She made many recordings for the BBC and appeared on BBC Television on her 82nd birthday.

During World War II she played for Dame Myra Hess at the National Gallery and later in life, Sir Adrian Boult. In 1951 she was appointed an Officer of the Order of the British Empire (OBE). Queen Elizabeth, the Queen Mother was both an admirer and a friend and sent good wishes for concerts on many occasions. She also worked as a teacher, her students including Eileen Joyce and many other distinguished pianists. She composed many pieces which have included ballads, song cycles, some larger-scaled works such as a symphony, a Concerto for Strings (1938), and many works for piano including two concertos and a Symphonic Danse Fantasy for piano and Strings. There were also two suites for strings, including In The Forest, which was performed in 2005, in Gloucester Cathedral by the Gloucester Academy of Music.

Adelina de Lara's autobiography entitled Finale was published in 1955 and she died at the age of 89 in Woking, Surrey on 25 November 1961.

== Family ==
Some of Adelina de Lara's descendants are also professional musicians. She was married to Thomas Johnson Shipwright, and after her son Denis Shipwright divorced his first wife her grandson Edward, a tenor, took his mother's maiden name (Hain) as his surname. Her relations include:

- Edward Hain, grandson and tenor.
- Great-grandchildren:
  - Kit Hain, songwriter/singer and one half of the British pop duo, Marshall Hain.
  - Tim Hain, Blues/Reggae guitarist, songwriter and author.
  - Mim Hain, artist/painter.
  - Jayl (also known as J.C. de Lara), singer, songwriter, poet and author.
  - William D.C. Lowdell, singer / songwriter and producer.
  - Gerry O'Riordan, music recording engineer.
- Great-Great-Great-Grandchildren:
  - Amy Roberts, Irish Trad pianist & concertina.

== External sources ==
- Free scores by Adelina de Lara at the International Music Score Library Project (IMSLP)
