= Edward Nicholl =

British army officer and politician (1862–1939)

Sir Edward Nicholl KBE JP DL

Member of Parliament for Penryn and Falmouth
- In office 1918–1922
- Preceded by: Sydney Goldman
- Succeeded by: Denis Shipwright

Personal details
- Born: 17 June 1862 Pool, Cornwall, England
- Died: 30 March 1939 (aged 76)
- Party: Conservative
- Military career
- Branch: Royal Naval Reserve
- Rank: Commander

Commander Sir Edward Nicholl KBE JP DL (17 June 1862 – 30 March 1939) was a British officer of the Royal Naval Reserve who subsequently became a Conservative Member of Parliament (MP).

== Early life ==
Nicholl was born at Ada Terrace, Pool, Cornwall . When he was 'no more than three years of age' the family moved to Redruth.

== Career ==
He left school at 12 and went to work as an Assistant Timekeeper at the Carn Brea Railway Works. Two years later he started an Engineering Apprenticeship with the Great Western Railway at Carn Brea. He left home at 18 to continue the apprenticeship in Swindon.

In 1889 was granted a Commission in the Royal Naval Reserve. He was knighted in 1916 for war services.

He was elected at the 1918 general election as MP for Penryn and Falmouth but did not seek re-election in 1922 general election.

He was a patron of the Cornwall County wrestling Association for many years.

In the King's Birthday Honours 1928, he was made a Knight Commander of the Order of the British Empire, for "political and public services".

Parliament of the United Kingdom
Preceded by Charles Sydney Goldman	Member of Parliament for Penryn and Falmouth; 1918 – 1922	Succeeded by Denis Shipwright
