= Carlos A. Coello Coello =

Mexican computer scientist

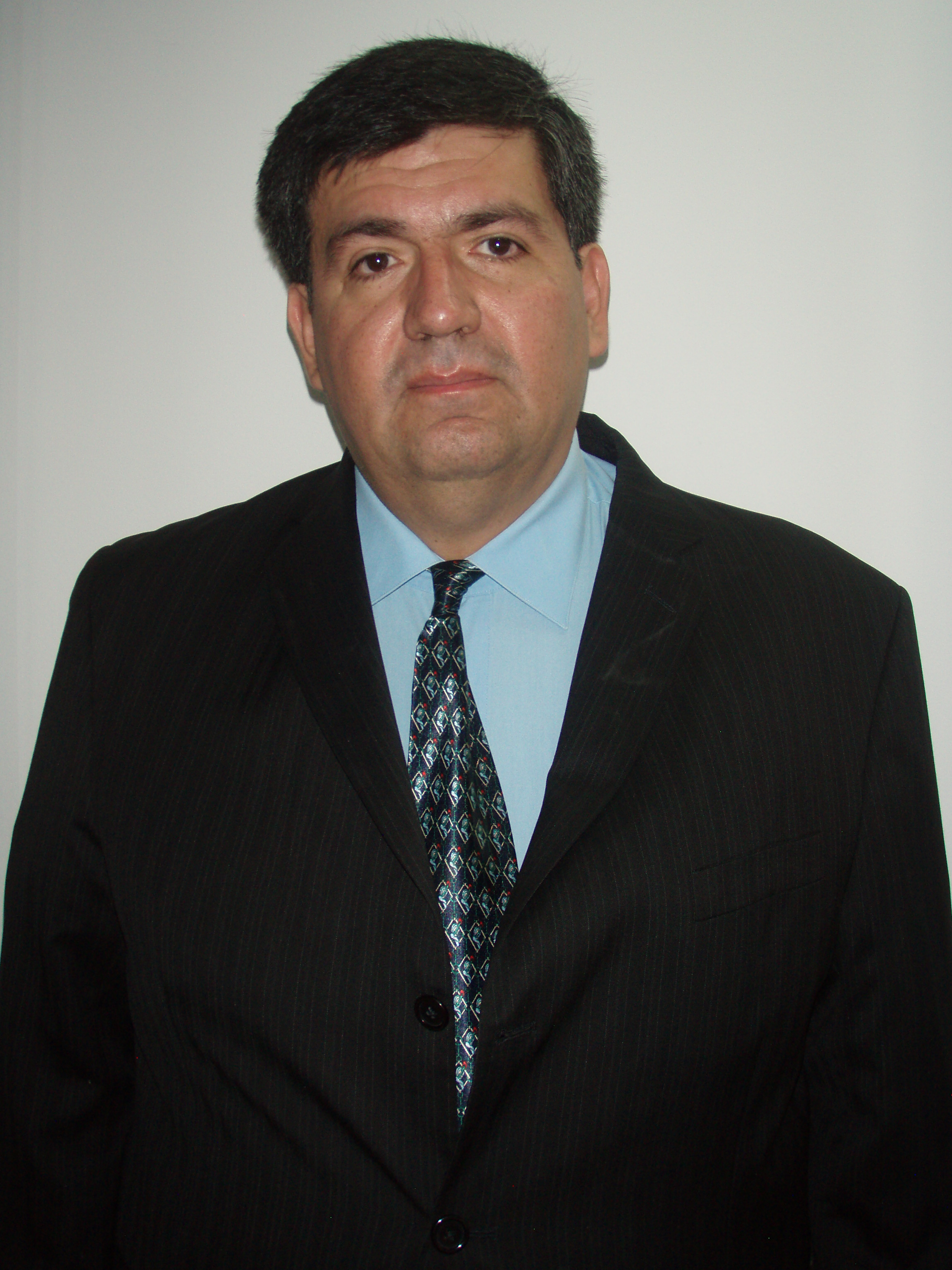
- Citizenship: Mexican
- Education: Tulane University
- Scientific career
- Workplaces: CINVESTAV, UNSW
- Doctoral students: Adriana Lara

Carlos A. Coello Coello is a Mexican computer scientist, Professor at the UNSW School of Engineering and Information Technology, and researcher at the CINVESTAV. His paper "Evolutionary algorithms for solving multi-objective problems" has been cited over 7,800 times. He won the IEEE Kiyo Tomiyasu Award in 2013.

== Selected publications ==
- Coello, CA Coello. "Evolutionary multi-objective optimization: a historical view of the field." IEEE computational intelligence magazine 1.1 (2006): 28–36.
- Coello, Carlos A. Coello, Gary B. Lamont, and David A. Van Veldhuizen. Evolutionary algorithms for solving multi-objective problems. Vol. 5. New York: Springer, 2007.
- Coello, Carlos A. Coello, Gregorio Toscano Pulido, and M. Salazar Lechuga. "Handling multiple objectives with particle swarm optimization." IEEE Transactions on evolutionary computation 8.3 (2004): 256–279.
- Coello, CA Coello, and M. Salazar Lechuga. "MOPSO: A proposal for multiple objective particle swarm optimization." Proceedings of the 2002 Congress on Evolutionary Computation. CEC'02 (Cat. No. 02TH8600). Vol. 2. IEEE, 2002.
