= Lara Martin =

British musician

Lara Martin is a musician and songwriter, most widely known as the former worship pastor of Abundant Life Church in Bradford, England. Lara moved away from the church, for personal reasons, in 2008 to Romania to help with disadvantaged street children. She is now based in Ilkley, West Yorkshire and works as a funeral director.

Her songs are featured on some of the church's albums, DVDs, music books and television programmes. The albums and DVDs are distributed in the UK by the Christian label Kingsway Music. The albums Higher, Divine Exchange, God Is Here, Sing, How Loved and Send Me all feature tracks written by her. She also led worship and sang on Let the World See Jesus.

Some of Martin's more popular songs have been included on Christian compilation albums such as Virgin's The Best Worship Songs... Ever! and are frequently covered live by other artists.

Martin is a mezzo-soprano singer and guitarist. She is also a member of the Nashville Songwriters Association International.

== Personal life ==
Born Lara Hughes in Belfast, she relocated to Bradford with her parents in the 1970s. She was raised in a house church, of which her father was one of the leaders, but she left the church as teenager. She came to faith again aged 21, having spent time working in a jewellers' by day and a heavy metal bar in the evening. She was initially appointed as a receptionist at Abundant Life Church. The leaders became aware of her music skills as she would often sing around the office. When the previous worship leader left the church in 1999, Paul Scanlon, the senior pastor, offered her the job of Worship Pastor.

She is married with two sons.

== Albums ==
- Higher (2000)
- Divine Exchange (2002)
- God Is Here (2003)
- How Loved (2004)
- Sing (2004)
- Let the World See Jesus (2005)
- Send Me (2007)

== Songs ==
- "Always"
- "As for Me/I Have Decided", co-written with Mark Stevens
- "Best Thing", co-written with Jock James
- "Blessed to Be a Blessing"
- "Forever Faithful", co-written with Dan Brummitt
- "God is Here"
- "He's Real", co-written with Dan Brummitt
- "How Amazing"
- "How Loved Am I"
- "Incredible"
- "I Trust in You"
- "Joined by Angels"
- "Miracle of Life"
- "More of You"
- "My Inspiration"
- "On Earth As in Heaven"
- "Peace", co-written with Mark Stevens
- "The Voice of Hope"
- "We Crown You Now", co-written with Mark Stevens
- "You Are My God"
- "You Are There"
- "You Never Fail Me"
- "You Take Up All of Me"
- "Your Grace Covers Me"
