= Kevin Smith (cricketer) =

English cricketer

Personal information
- Full name: Kevin Brian Smith
- Born: 28 August 1957 (age 69); Brighton, Sussex, England
- Batting: Left-handed
- Bowling: Slow left-arm orthodox

Domestic team information
- Years: Team
- 1978: Sussex

Career statistics
Competition	First-class	List A
Matches	4	2
Runs scored	90	6
Batting average	12.85	6.00
100s/50s	0/0	0/0
Top score	43	6
Catches/stumpings	1/–	0/–
- Source: Cricinfo, 23 November 2011

Kevin Brian Smith (born 28 August 1957) is an English former cricketer. Smith was a left-handed batsman who bowled slow left-arm orthodox. He was born at Brighton, Sussex.

Smith made his first-class debut for Sussex against Oxford University in 1978. He made three further first-class appearances for the county in the 1978 season, against Middlesex, Gloucestershire and Kent. In his four first-class appearances, Smith scored 90 runs at an average of 12.85, with a high score of 43. In that same season he made two List A appearances against Hampshire and Northamptonshire in the 1978 John Player League.

His uncle, Gerald Cogger, also played first-class cricket for Sussex.
