= Lara Berman =

American-Israeli news correspondent

- לארה ברמן
- Born: May 5, 1980 (age 45)
- Other names: לארה ברמן (Hebrew)
- Occupations: news correspondent journalist
- Known for: Journalist work Video productions Entrepreneurship
- Parent(s): Julie M. Berman; Joseph Berman
- Relatives: Dane Berman (brother)
- Awards: Best On-Air Talent; Yeoman Award
- Website: www.laraberman.com

Lara Berman Krinsky (Hebrew: לארה ברמן; born May 5, 1980) is an American and Israeli on-air news correspondent, journalist, actress, entrepreneur and a Pro-Israel activist. She has worked with numerous well-known news outlets such as the Discovery Network, The Jerusalem Post, Haaretz, Ynet, The Jewish Journal, The Fort Worth Star Telegram, and The Times of Israel.

== Biography ==
=== Early years ===
Lara Berman was born to Israeli born artist Julie M. Berman (Mee'tal) and Dr. Joseph Berman. She is the older sister of musician Dane Berman.

=== Education ===
In 1998, Berman left her home in Texas to earn her undergraduate degree from New York University's Tisch School of the Arts and her master's degree from USC's Annenberg School of Journalism.

In 2012, she attended Ariel University Center of Samaria and earned her certification in New Media and Public Diplomacy.

== Career ==
=== Media, television, film and theater ===
After finishing high school in 1998 and throughout her college years at NYU's Tisch School of the Arts and USC, Lara took part in numerous television, film, and theater productions both in New York and Los Angeles.

As of April 2004, Lara is a member of the Screen Actors Guild (SAG).

During her years at the University of Southern California, Berman hosted a talk show entitled CU@USC. During that time, she reported widely from the red-carpets of Hollywood.

Her award-winning, live reporting featured actors, directors, musicians and politicians and attracted followings around the world, especially in Russia and Japan.

In 2016, she returned to the stage to perform multiple characters in the off-Broadway musical, Baby produced by Creative Arts Lab at The Clurman Theatre and directed by Gwen Arment.

Berman founded the Intuitive Eating Peer Group, based on the book Intuitive Eating authored by Elyse Resch. The group served to help women reject destructive diet mentalities, and to instead cultivate positive and healthy relationships with food and their bodies. Berman led the group for five years, produced a monthly Intuitive Eating Newsletter during that time, and as a journalist, hosted a TV program around the topic. Her work with Intuitive Eating was featured in a 2010 article piece in Oprah Winfrey's, O Magazine.

=== Zionist activism ===
Berman is an outspoken advocate of Israel and is the co-creator and co-host of Israel in Context, a political satire video series that reaches thousands of online viewers and provides facts about Israel. She has also co-created videos and campaigns for the pro-Israel, non-profit Stand With Us.

In addition, Berman was a prominent journalist for the Jewish News One international news network.

In a 2010 article for The Jewish Journal, Berman described her street experience as a returning Israeli citizen.

In 2012, Berman participated in an exclusive, in-depth seminar which brought together 40 media professionals from around the world to study the media's role in the Middle East conflict, with special emphasis on the occupied territories.

Berman's blog "Joyish", is sometimes featured in The Times of Israel.

== Awards ==
Berman has received the following awards:

- Best On-Air Talent – Trojan Vision Television – May 2008
- Yeoman Award – Lieberman Research Worldwide – October 2013
