= Herbert Siebner =

German painter

Herbert Johannes Josef Siebner (April 16, 1925 – August 3, 2003) was born in Stettin, Prussia, and died in Victoria, Canada. Siebner was an Expressionist painter, printmaker, and sculptor. Siebner studied graphic arts under Max E. A. Richter (1941–43) in Berlin. Siebner served in the German Army from 1943 to 1945, until he was captured by the Soviets in 1945. After the war, Siebner studied at the Academy for Fine Arts & Culture, Berlin under Prof. Max Kaus and Ernst Shumacher (1946–49), and was soon exhibiting his works in exhibitions and galleries. Siebner emigrated to Canada in 1954, settling in Victoria, BC, where he opened an art studio and began teaching his craft.

In 1955 Siebner held a one-man show at the Art Gallery of Greater Victoria, and in 1956 he won the Canadian National Award in Graphic Arts. By 1958, Siebner's art was displayed in Berlin, Toronto, Vancouver, Victoria, Seattle, Eugene, Los Angeles. 1958, Siebner was included in the International Graphic Exposition in Lugano, Switzerland. 1962–63 Siebner traveled and worked in Europe, after winning a Canada Council Senior Arts Fellowship grant.

Siebner was a founding member of the Limners, a group of Victoria artists that came together to support, exhibit, and discuss their works. (The group is also known as the Society of Limners (Victoria), and the Victoria Limners Society.)
