= Lara =

Lara may refer to:

== People ==
- Lara (name), can be a given name or a surname in several languages
- Lara (mythology), a naiad nymph, daughter of the river Almo in Ovid's Fasti

== Places ==
- Lara (state), a state in Venezuela
- Electoral district of Lara, an electoral district in Victoria, Australia
- Lara, Antalya, an urban district in Turkey
- Lara, Victoria, a township in Australia
  - Lara railway station
- Lara de los Infantes, a place in Spain
- Punta Lara, a city in Buenos Aires Province, Argentina
- LARA, the airport code for Jacinto Lara International Airport, in Barquisimeto, Venezuela

== Art, entertainment, and media ==
- Lara (2019 film), a German drama film
- Lara (2025 film), an Indian Tamil-language suspense thriller film
- Lara (DC Comics), the biological mother of the comic book character Superman
- Lara (novel), 1997 novel-in-verse by Bernardine Evaristo
- Lara's Theme, the generic name given to a leitmotif written for the film Doctor Zhivago (1965) by composer Maurice Jarre
- Lara, A Tale (1814), a poem by Lord Byron

== Natural science ==
- Lara (genus), a genus of beetles
- Lara, a cultivar of walnut

== Sport ==
- Cardenales de Lara, a professional baseball club in Venezuela
- Unión Lara, a professional soccer club in Venezuela

== Other uses ==
- LaRa, a spacecraft instrument on board the ExoMars 2020 platform
- Lara FS Academy
- Lara language
- Ligne Aerienne du Roi Albert (LARA), an early attempt at civil aviation in the then Belgian colony of Congo
- United States v. Lara (2004), a U.S. Supreme Court case

== See also ==
- Lar (disambiguation)
- Laraha
- Lora (disambiguation)
