= Jakob Martin =

American musician

Martin Storrow (also known as Jakob Martin) is an American songwriter, composer, performer, and recording artist.

Martin has released six albums independently, "Matches" (2007), "Masking the Mirror" (2008) "City of the Nameless" (2009), "Leave The Light On" (2010), "California Songs" (2011), and The Prophet - Vol. 1 (2021). "Matches" earned Martin mainstream media attention, but sold only 2,000 copies, and received mixed reviews. "City of the Nameless" was produced by Dan Diaz in San Diego and features collaborations with Brodeeva (of G. Love fame) Aaron Bowen, Stepchylde Tha Phoenix, and Matt Hensley of the band Flogging Molly. The North County Times called the release "superb" and JVibe magazine claimed that Jakob is "revolutionizing" the acoustic music genre.

== Early life ==
When Martin was three years old, his mother bought him a guitar at a Jumble sale, according to a 2009 Trojan Vision interview. He became addicted to music and continued performing throughout high school and college, eventually opting to pursue music full-time upon graduating from University of California, San Diego in 2005.

== Career ==
Martin began to receive more independent media recognition for his work in 2009, surrounding the release of "City of the Nameless", but has been most often recognized as a touring performer, having made nearly 1,000 concert appearances since 2005.

In 2008, Martin was selected out of nearly 1,000 artists as one of the top "Talented 20-Somethings" in a competition sponsored by the popular nationally syndicated radio show A Prairie Home Companion on National Public Radio and was featured on the show's website.

Martin often tours independently as a headliner at small clubs, listening rooms, and university festivals, but has also appeared as an opening act and makes frequent Guest Appearances with other artists. He has recently shared stages with many well-known artists, including, Ari Hest, Everclear (band), Tristan Prettyman, Glen Phillips, Sean Hayes (musician), Hellogoodbye, and Ryan Cabrera. He is also a member of the underground Vibe Night Crew.

Martin cites the Guitar as his primary instrument, but also performs on Piano and Harmonica.

In 2010, Jakob raised over $12,000 with the help of fans and used the money to record and release "California Songs". The album features a combination of new and old material.

== Personal life ==
In 2008, Martin (who had been performing under the name Martin Storrow) opted to take on the stage name Jakob Martin. He explained the name change to the San Diego Reader, saying, "As an artist, there's a precarious balance between your private personal life and the very personal things you make public through your art. There was one moment when I realized I was actually considering changing a lyric because I didn't want to offend the person I wrote it about. That's when I realized I needed some separation; it can't be about me. It has to be about the music..."

In March, 2012, Martin announced that he was going back to performing under his given name, Martin Storrow.
