= Denis Shipwright =

Denis Shipwright AE FRSA

Member of Parliament for Penryn and Falmouth
- In office 15 November 1922 – 6 December 1923
- Preceded by: Edward Nicholl
- Succeeded by: Courtenay Mansel

Personal details
- Born: 20 May 1898 London, United Kingdom
- Died: 13 September 1984 (aged 86)
- Party: Conservative (UK)
- Spouse: Kate Hain (m. 1921; div. 1926)
- Parents: Thomas Johnson Shipwright (father); Adelina de Lara (mother)

Military service
- Allegiance: United Kingdom
- Branch/service: British Army (1914-1918); Royal Air Force (1918-1921, 1939-1945); Territorial Army
- Years of service: 1914–1954
- Rank: Captain
- Battles/wars: First World War; Second World War

Denis Ewart Bernard Kingston Shipwright AE FRSA (20 May 1898 – 13 September 1984) was a British soldier and Royal Air Force officer who served throughout both world wars. In his youth he became a motor racing driver; after a brief political career, he found it difficult to find work but eventually went into the film industry. His later life was spent working as a civil servant but he kept up his hobbies and developed an interest in Unidentified Flying Objects.

== Early life and wartime service ==
Shipwright was born in London, the second son of Thomas Johnson Shipwright; his mother was the classical pianist and composer Adelina de Lara. At the age of 16 in 1914 he enlisted in the Army as a Private. He initially fought in the First World War as a Despatch Rider with the 2/1st Kent Cyclist Battalion (attached to the Queen's Own Royal West Kent Regiment), and then became a Pilot for the Royal Flying Corps.

=== Pilot ===
Shipwright as a pilot was noted for his sense of humour and was said to have a "devil-may-care attitude". He was wounded and crashed while flying a mission around the Somme. He was promoted from the ranks, becoming a temporary second lieutenant in the RFC on 5 July 1917, and a captain in the Royal Air Force in 1918. He was also a lieutenant in the 96th Devon Yeomanry Brigade, and after the end of the war became an acting captain in the Royal 1st Devon Yeomanry in 1920. He was appointed to the administrative branch of the Royal Air Force, relinquishing his appointment in March 1921 on appointment to the Territorial forces but retaining the rank of captain.

His father died young; in 1918 Shipwright became engaged to Kate Hain, daughter of Sir Edward Hain (former Liberal Member of Parliament for St Ives). and they married on 20 March of that year. He also continued his education at Lille University and University College, Oxford. In 1920 he was admitted to the Middle Temple although still only an Oxford undergraduate.

== Motor racing ==
In August 1920 Shipwright bought a 30 hp racing car from Armstrong Siddeley which over the winter he tuned up and modified to improve its performance; he also fitted an airspeed indicator and altimeter. In 1921 he won the 24th running of the "100 mph Long Handicap" at Brooklands having been given a favourable handicap. Shipwright also wrote to The Autocar explaining how he had driven his car from Hyde Park Corner in London to St Ives in Cornwall and made a good average speed without the car breaking down. The letter prompted a reply from Lord Curzon who objected that publicising his activities would encourage the police to set more speed traps for motorists. Shipwright kept up his interest in motor racing and in April 1930 bought another Armstrong Siddeley car. He competed in other speed trials and hill climbs.

== Politics ==
On 17 December 1921 Shipwright was adopted as a Conservative candidate for Penryn and Falmouth, succeeding the retiring Conservative MP Sir Edward Nicholl. Shipwright was only 23 years old but his record of serving throughout the war was noted. He had begun a business career as a Director of Porthia China Clays Ltd. During his election campaign Shipwright's election address pledged him to a strong Navy, and a foreign policy which aimed at securing an honourable peace with a just settlement of reparations and war debts. In domestic policy he sought economy without decreasing safety and efficiency. The Liberal Party's national split was mirrored in Penryn and Falmouth with Sir Courtenay Mansel fighting as the official candidate but opposed by George Hay Morgan who was a former MP for Truro; there was also a Labour Party candidate. Shipwright won the election with 11,566 votes and a majority of 2,687 over Mansel. To celebrate his election, the ex-servicemen of Falmouth ceremoniously dragged his motor car uphill to the station when he caught the train to London to take his seat.

== Parliament ==
Shipwright made his maiden speech in a debate on unemployment on 8 March 1923. He attributed part of the blame for the state of unemployment to the miners' strike of 1921 and pointed out that every tin mine in Cornwall had closed down after that strike and had not reopened. He gave praise to the Conservative government for reducing the number of unemployed people and appealed for more faith, goodwill, and confidence. His speech was received with cheers. This proved to be his only speech before the short 1922 Parliament was dissolved and Shipwright was forced to face re-election. Unlike the previous election, the Liberal reunification meant he faced a straight fight with Sir Courtenay Mansel. Government proposals for the China clay industry, where mines in the constituency had been going through tough economic times, were thought to be a major issue. Shipwright lost his seat, polling 10,429 votes to Mansel's 17,015.

== Employment troubles ==
Initially, Shipwright went back to the armed services where he was promoted to the 26th Anti-Aircraft Battalion of the Territorial Royal Engineers in 1924. Shipwright's first marriage ended in divorce in 1926. He found it difficult to find work after his Parliamentary career ended, and in September 1927 had to resort to advertising in The Times:

Ex-M.P., age 29. CANNOT GET WORK; Oxonian; exceptional record and qualifications; highest references; willing to work in any capacity.—Captain Shipwright, "Walmarama," Wolsey-road, Esher, Surrey.

He did find work in the film industry, being assistant director on Love's Option (1928) and production manager on Auld Lang Syne in 1929 for Welsh-Pearson-Elder. He worked as a Director of Cinephonic Music Co. Ltd and later in production and administration for the Gaumont British Picture Corporation and for its sister company Gainsborough Pictures. As such in 1935 he became a representative of the Film Producers Group on the Federation of British Industries, a member of the Kinematograph Advisory Committee, and an adviser to the British Films Advancement Council.

== Return to RAF ==
On 16 May 1939, Shipwright was granted a commission as a Pilot Officer (on probation) in the Royal Air Force, and resigned his commission in the Reserve of Officers for the Royal Engineers. Shortly after the outbreak of the Second World War, on 9 September 1939, Shipwright was confirmed in his appointment and promoted to Flying Officer. Passing out of RAF Training College in 1940, Shipwright served in France in 1940, being mentioned in despatches. In 1941, while serving in the Royal Air Force Volunteer Reserve, Shipwright was made bankrupt on a petition by his creditors, but this move did not interrupt his career. He undertook a special mission to Gibraltar. visiting R.D.F (Radar) stations in June 1942, and was promoted to temporary Squadron Leader on 1 September 1942. In 1944 he was awarded the Air Efficiency Award and remained serving with the RAF until 1945. In 1954 he relinquished his commission in the Royal Air Force Volunteer Reserve, retaining his rank of Squadron Leader.

== Civilian life ==
After the end of the war, Shipwrights went to work for the General Post Office. He became a Fellow of the Royal Society of the Arts in 1946. In 1950 Shipwright joined the Surrey Special Constabulary, and in 1953 he was made a major in the 11th (HG) Battalion of the Queen's Royal Regiment. When discharged from the RAF in 1954 he became a civil servant as an officer with the Ministry of Agriculture, Fisheries, and Food in Guildford.

Maintaining his interest in motoring, Shipwright became a member of the Civil Service Motoring Association, and of the Brooklands Society; he was also a member of the Company of Veteran Motorists and the Order of Knights of the Road. His aviation interests were pursued through membership in the De Havilland Moth Club and of Fairoaks Flight Centre. Despite being in his 80s Shipwright obtained a flight certificate from Europa Airships Operations in 1982. He also became interested in Unidentified flying objects, becoming a member of the British UFO Research Association and chairman of the North East Surrey Group of the Contact UFO Research Investigation Association. He was additionally a member of the British Society for the Turin Shroud.

Shipwright also became interested in Scottish culture and was a member of the Sir Harry Lauder Society of Portobello from 1979, and also of the Edinburgh International Festival Society and Guild. His entry in Who's Who notes that he was a voluntary driver for Surrey County Council Hospitals Car and Ambulance Service and a Governor of the Royal Hospital and Home for Incurables; it records that he was made a Knight of the Order of St John of Jerusalem.

Parliament of the United Kingdom
Preceded by Sir Edward Nicholl	Member of Parliament for Penryn and Falmouth; 1922 – 1923	Succeeded by Sir Courtenay Mansel
