= Lara Rose =

British singer, songwriter and recording artist

Lara Rose is a British singer, songwriter and recording artist with gospel, soul, funk and R&B roots. Her early singing experience started in school and church where she sang in the choir and performed with various gospel artists.

Rose has worked and collaborated with a host of artist, and has been called soul diva or funk diva. She says, "if you want to coin me a diva then call me the 'underground urban diva'!" She says it reflects the host of musical projects to date that still remain secret and underground. As a session vocalist, Rose has performed background vocals on all albums with Corinne Bailey Rae.

Rose has appeared in musicals including ethnomusicologist Geraldine Connor's Carnival Messiah, performing at the West Yorkshire Playhouse, Leeds, Harewood House and the Royal Albert Hall. Rose continues to contribute to the dance music scene, collaborating with a host of DJs, hip hop and dance music producers including DJ Agent M, DJ Planky, DJ Dr Watson and music producer Tom Quick. She continues to make appearances at local R&B and jazz concerts such as DJ Lubi's Soul Rebels, in what Rose calls "drop-ins for a sing song!"

Images of Rose and other Leeds musicians have been captured on canvas by Leeds fine artist Neil Hardy, in his Funk'd exhibition.

She has recorded and toured with the James Taylor Quartet, performing the funk single "Free", which also features on the JTQ Room at the Top album.

Lara Rose joined the Leeds-based band The Soul Circle Gang. In 2012, the band played a number of UK music festivals including Beatherder, Beacons and Sheffield's Tramlines Festival. As well as performing at many UK venues, The Soul Circle Gang released their first single, "Fresh Fruit", in late 2012.

Following the retirement of The Soul Circle Gang, Lara Rose continued her soul circle journey of exploring African music interposed with contemporary modern music, coining the term "Afropolitan Melodies". Lara Rose & the Afropolitan Melodies incorporate the Yoruba language into soulful melodic songs stripped down to voice and guitar accompaniment performed by Rose. "Tonight (lale yi)", the first single for her EP Afropolitan Melodies, went on to be shortlisted for the first playlist in 2015 on BBC Introducing West Yorkshire, hosted by Alan Raw and Darren Williams.

Rose, influenced by a visit from an aunt studied to be a pharmacist and is a member of the General Pharmaceutical Council (GPHC). Rose fulfilled the family ethos of growing up to be in a "notable" profession. She is actively involved in the world of pharmacy, and served on the RPSGB Leeds & District Branch Council as Chairman, Chairman elect and Public Relations Officer (BPRO). Rose currently serves in the newly formed professional body the Royal Pharmaceutical Society, as the Leeds RPS locality lead, and sits on the West Yorkshire RPS Steering Committee.

== Discography ==
- Live At The Underground - Zolga;
- Boogie Man - Capri (Putting it all together) GLP;
- "Free/Sky" - James Taylor Quartet 7" Single - Blow it Hard Records;
- Room At The Top - James Taylor Quartet ("Free") - Sanctuary Records
- Nasty Boy - Zolga;
- Once Beloved - ZOLGA/GLP
- Satellite Sweetheart - Dave Formula- Lead vocalist - Wire Sound Ltd
- Baggies on The Dancefloor - ZOLGA
- Fresh Fruit - TSCG
- Umbrella of Life - TSCG
- "Tonight (lale yi)" - ZOLGA
- Nomad Woman - ZOLGA

== Other sources ==
- The Pharmaceutical Journal, 7 February 2004 (vol. 272), p. 151.
