= Robin Coger =

American biomedical engineer and academic administrator

Robin N. Coger is an American biomedical engineer and academic administrator, formerly the provost and senior vice chancellor for academic affairs at East Carolina University. Her research as a biomedical engineer has focused on artificial organs and particularly on liver support systems.

== Education and career ==
Coger majored in mechanical engineering at Cornell University, graduating in 1988. She went to the University of California, Berkeley for graduate study in mechanical engineering, earning a master's degree in 1990 and completing her doctorate there in 1993.

She was a postdoctoral researcher at the Harvard Medical School and Massachusetts General Hospital before joining the faculty at the University of North Carolina at Charlotte in 1996. At the University of North Carolina, she founded the Center for Biomedical Engineering Science, and served as interim department chair. In 2011, she moved to North Carolina A&T State University to become dean of engineering and professor of mechanical engineering. In 2022 she moved again, to her most recent administrative position as provost and senior vice chancellor for academic affairs at East Carolina University.

Coger has chaired the Council of Engineering Deans of Historically Black Colleges and Universities. She is also a member of the Board of Directors of FIRST, a youth robotics community delivering robotics competitions throughout the world.

== Recognition ==
Coger was named an ASME Fellow and a Fellow of the American Institute for Medical and Biological Engineering "for significant contributions in building biomedical engineering programs, and in the fields of liver tissue engineering and biopreservation", both in 2010.

In 2019, she was featured on the cover of US Black Engineer magazine, which called her "a true visionary leader", and highlighted the college she headed as the country's "top producer of Black engineers". Dr. Coger is also a 2024 ASME Dedicated Service Awardee, which honors "unusual dedicated voluntary service to the Society marked by outstanding performance, demonstrated effective leadership, prolonged and committed service, devotion, enthusiasm and faithfulness".
