= LIFE Church UK =

Coordinates: 53°47′59″N 1°44′44″W

LIFE Church
- LIFE Church
- Location: Bradford, West Yorkshire
- Country: England
- Website: lifechurchhome.com

History
- Former name(s): Church House; Abundant Life Church
- Founded: 1976

Clergy
- Pastor(s): Jonathan 'Jock' and Shirley James

LIFE Church UK, formerly the Abundant Life Church, is a Christian megachurch established and based in Bradford, England

== History ==
LIFE Church has its roots in the Charismatic Restoration movement of Arthur Wallis. It was founded in 1976 by Bryn Jones, one of the early Restoration/British New Church leaders, by an amalgamation of three small Bradford churches: a charismatic Brethren Assembly based at the Bolton Woods Gospel Hall; an independent charismatic church made up mostly of former Baptists who had been unable to continue in their church because of their charismatic beliefs; and the New Covenant Church, a fellowship originally under the apostolic leadership of G. W. North.

In its early days it met in the Anglican Church House and so was known locally as Church House. Later known as Abundant Life Church for a number of years, in 2012 the name was shortened to LIFE Church, reflecting a move into a season of new leadership and direction.

Since 2000, LIFE Church has become more widely known through its regular radio and television broadcasts. Programmes are broadcast on God TV, United Christian Broadcasters, Australian Christian Channel and several other stations around the world. The church also has a weekly half-hour slot on Cross Rhythms radio. Many of the programmes broadcast on TV and radio are also available as podcasts and on YouTube.

The church organises annual conferences and events which are attended by Christians the UK and beyond.

== Facilities ==
The church's main location is in Bradford, West Yorkshire. The Bradford campus has a coffee shop, serving coffee from local roasters North Star Coffee, and connected to the youth building is a skatepark.

== College ==
Life10 is based in Bradford, England.

== Leadership ==
Paul Scanlon was the senior pastor of the church until 2012, having been part of the team alongside his wife Glenda since 1980. In 1997, he led the then Abundant Life Church during a period of transition that later became known as 'Crossing Over', during which it left Covenant Ministries. In 2012, Paul and Glenda’s eldest daughter and son in law; husband and wife, Steve and Charlotte Gambill were appointed as lead pastors of the church.

In 2021, David and Abigail Niblock were the Leeds campus Pastors, Maciek and Iga Liziniewicz were the Warsaw campus Pastors, Jock and Shirley James were the Bradford campus Pastors and Liam and Natalie Gordon were the Belfast campus Pastors.

In 2022, it was announced that the Leeds campus would be released to become an independent church, and they have since become “North^Church”. It was also announced in May 2022 that Liam and Natalie Gordon would be stepping down as campus pastors, and the Belfast campus would be closing. In 2023 LIFE Church Warsaw was also released to be an independent church, now known as 'Warsaw LIFE'.

As of April 2022, Pastors Steve & Charlotte Gambill passed on leadership of LIFE Church Bradford to Jonathan 'Jock' and Shirley James.

== Music ==
The church has produced a number of albums and singles, mainly recorded live. They also publish music from church services and conferences online. The early recordings were distributed by Kingsway Communications and later albums by Integrity Music. Dance Again, a live album released in May 2014 entered UK Albums Chart in the top 40.

=== Discography ===
Title	Band	Release year
Higher	Abundant Life Ministries	2000
Divine Exchange	Abundant Life Ministries	2002
God is Here	Abundant Life Ministries	2003
How Loved	Abundant Life Ministries	2004
Let the World See Jesus	Abundant Life Church	2005
RPM: Live	RPM	2005
I Surrender All	RPM	2005
Give My All	RPM	2007
Send Me	Abundant Life Church	2007
Sound of Praise EP	RPM	2010
Name Above All Names	ALM:UK	2010
I Am Future	I Am Future	2012
Dance Again	LIFE Worship	2014
Love Let Loose	I Am Future	2015
Wide Open Space	LIFE Worship	2016
Speak to the Storm	LIFE Worship	2018
Love is Life	I Am Future	2018
Your Name	LIFE Worship	2020
Your Name - Reimagined, Vol. 1	LIFE Worship	2020
Seek First: Songs for Devotion	LIFE Worship	2021
Your Name - Reimagined, Vol. 2	LIFE Worship	2021
With Us (Emmanuel)	LIFE Worship	2021
