= Jacob Martin (politician) =

American politician (??–??)

Jacob Martin was a state legislator in Alabama. He represented Dallas County, Alabama during the Reconstruction era. His post office was at Martin's Station. He signed, with other Republican members of the Alabama legislature, an 1875 memorial of alleged electoral abuses. He and other Alabama state legislators who were African-American and served during the Reconstruction era are listed on a historical marker.
