= Carlos Lara Bareiro =

Paraguayan musician, composer and conductor

- Born: March 16, 1914; Capiatá, Paraguay
- Died: October 20, 1987 (aged 73); Buenos Aires, Argentina
- Genres: Impressionist
- Occupations: Musician

Carlos Lara Bareiro (March 16, 1914 – October 20, 1987) was a Paraguayan classical musician, composer and conductor.

== Childhood and youth ==
He was born on the March 6, 1914, to Juan Carlos Lara Castro and Lorenza Bareiro in Capiatá, Paraguay. He inherited the aptitude and vocation for music from his father and learned the basics of this art which he would then dominate. He began his studies in the Battalion musician's band of the Boy Scouts. From 1932, he studied in the capital police musician's band and in the Paraguayan ateneo, with Remberto Giménez.

== Career ==
Between the years 1940 and 1943 Lara Bareiro was the president of the Paraguayan association of musicians and in 1943 he got a scholarship from Brazil to study in the University of the National School Music in Rio the Janeiro where he stayed for eight years. He studied harmony, counterpoint and fuga with Newton Padua, José Paula da Silva and Virginia Fiuzza, composition with Joao Ottaviano and violin with Francisco Chiafitelli. He also received orquestal directions lessons from Francisco Mignone, with which he got to be the musician with the best academic formation in Paraguay. He produced songs like "El sueño de Renée" and "Suite Guaraní" of Juan Max Boettner and the "Sinfonía en Si Bemol" of Otakar Platil. In 1954 he directed "Madame Butterfly" of Giacomo Puccini with the cast of Sofía Mendoza.

His campaign in favour of the symphonic orchestra of the Paraguayan Association of Musicians and his members accumulated experience created the right atmosphere for the foundation of the Symphonic Orchest of Asuncion in 1957.

Due to the political situation in his country, he was confined to the countryside and then exiled in 1955. He lived in Argentina for more than three decades, as a lot of other Paraguayan musicians, without being able of going back to their country. During this time he directed concerts in Buenos Aires and Santiago. He recorded LPs with the symphonic orchestra of the Teachers orchestral Association of the capital, and he dedicated as a chorus director and teacher. As an Orchestra director he is remember by his discipline and organization.

In his compositions we find translations influenced by the impressionist style, with the utilization of material from the folk Paraguay's musical. His work was rewritten during the thirty five years of dictatorship of the general Alfredo Stroessner (1954–1989) and it could be broadcast once that regime was over.

== Works ==
His symphonic works include:

- "Suites paraguayas 1 y 2” de la serie “Acuarelas Paraguayas"
- "Concierto para piano y orquesta"
- "Gran guarania en Do mayor Koeju mba'e apohara rapepe", estrenada por la orquesta Sinfónica de Río de Janeiro
- "Guarania Sinfónica para coro y orquesta", sobre el texto “Ñande poyvi gûype” de Enrique Bogado
- "Guarania Nº 3 en Re, Ñasaindy jave", sobre texto de Darío Gómez Serrato.

His best piano produccions are:

- "Acuarelas Paraguayas" y para guitarra
- "Tres piezas en Mi: Preludio agreste, Guarania y Alegría"

He is also an author of popular songs and symphonic arrangements of folk inspirational music, between them “Cholí” of José Asunción Flores and “Mi destino” of Mauricio Cardozo Ocampo.

== Distinctions ==
In 1996 he received the National Governments decoration "Honor al mérito", and in 1997 a book about his memories was published.
