= Gerald Cogger =

English cricketer (1933–2019)

Personal information
- Full name: Gerald Lyndley Cogger
- Born: 7 September 1933; Uckfield, East Sussex, England
- Died: 2019 (aged 85); West Sussex, England
- Batting: Right-handed
- Bowling: Right-arm medium-fast
- Relatives: Kevin Smith (nephew)

Domestic team information
- Years: Team
- 1954–1957: Sussex

Career statistics
Competition	First-class
Matches	8
Runs scored	12
Batting average	1.71
100s/50s	0/0
Top score	5
Balls bowled	546
Wickets	7
Bowling average	40.85
5 wickets in innings	0
10 wickets in match	0
Best bowling	3/20
Catches/stumpings	5/–
- Source: Cricinfo, 23 November 2011

Gerald Lyndley Cogger (7 September 1933 – 2019) was an English cricketer. He was a right-handed batsman who bowled right-arm medium-fast. Cogger was born at Uckfield, East Sussex.

Cogger made his first-class debut for Sussex against Oxford University in 1954. He made seven further first-class appearances for the county, all of which came in the 1957 season, and the last of which came against Somerset. In his eight first-class appearances, Cogger took 7 wickets at an average of 40.85, with a high best figures of 3/20. A tailender, he scored just 12 runs at a batting average of 1.71, with a high score of 5.

Cogger died in West Sussex in 2019, at the age of 85. His nephew, Kevin Smith, also played first-class cricket.
