= Lara Santana =

Brazilian politician (born 1993)

Member of the Legislative Assembly of Pernambuco
- Incumbent
- Assumed office 1 February 2027

Personal details
- Born: 2 March 1993 (age 33)
- Party: Green Party
- Domestic partner: João Henrique Campos (2012–2019)
- Parents: Carlos José de Santana (father); Simone Santana (mother)

Lara de Oliveira Santana (born 2 March 1993) is a Brazilian politician who was elected member of the Legislative Assembly of Pernambuco in 2026. She is the daughter of Carlos José de Santana and Simone Santana. From 2018 to 2019, she was engaged to João Henrique Campos.
