= Lara Pavlović =

Croatian handball player (born 1998)

Lara Brezenci ex. Pavlović
Personal information
- Full name: Lara Brezenci
- Nationality: Croatian
- Born: 14 December 1998 (age 27) Koprivnica, Croatia
- Height: 1.75 m (5 ft 9 in)

Sport
- Sport: Handball
- Position: Right wing/back
- Current club: Rostocker Handball Club
- Number: 4

Senior clubs
- Years: Team
- 2005-2017.: HC Podravka Vegeta

Lara Brezenci (born 14. December 1998.) is a Croatian handballer.

== Achievements ==
- Croatian First League:
  - Winner: 2017
- Croatian Cup:
  - Winner: 2017

Croatian Cup Winner 2018 Erice Italy 2019, Best scorer IT.
