= Martha Lara =

Mexican diplomat and politician

Ambassador Martha I. Lara is a prominent Mexican career diplomat and politician.

Elected Federal Senator for the State of Chihuahua, she served her full six-year term from 1994 to 2000, becoming president of the Senate for the first period of ordinary sessions in 1995, and was vice president of the Latin American Parliament from 1996 to 2000.

From 1994 to 2000, during her Senate mandate, Ambassador Lara was secretary of the Foreign Affairs Global Commission and member of the Migration, Human Rights and Northern Border Affairs Commissions. From 1998 to 2000, she was chairwoman of the important Foreign Affairs Commission for North America.

She had an active role in the U.S.-Mexico Inter-Parliamentary Meetings since 1997, presiding the meeting held in Savannah, Georgia, and co-presiding the meetings held in the States of Puebla and Michoacán, Mexico. She participated in the World Inter-Parliamentary Union Conference in El Cairo, Egypt; in the Inter-Parliamentary Meeting of the European Union-Latin America in Caracas, Venezuela; and in the APEC Inter-Parliamentary Forum in Lima, Peru.

Within the government of the State of Chihuahua, she was both secretary of state and lieutenant governor from 1986 to 1992, holding the position of governor pro tempore (interim governor) during 1991, being the first female governor in that state's history. She also served as chair of the Censor Committee for Public Works Proposals, alternate president of the Population State Board, president of the editorial board of the Department of Labor and Social Services, president of the State Program Against Cholera, coordinator of the State Program for Political Commitment and chair of the State Commission for the Transition of Power.

In the Mexican Ministry of Foreign Affairs, she has held different posts since 1971: in the Department of Economic Affairs, the Under Secretariat of Foreign Relations and the General Directorates of the United Nations, Specialized Organizations and International Organizations. She also held the position of Deputy Mexican Representative before the Women’s Inter-American Commission of the Organization of American States, in Washington, D.C.

She has represented Mexico before relevant international forums such as the Preparation Committee of the United Nations World Conference on the Decade for Women in New York City, and Copenhagen, Denmark; the High-Level Meeting of the Non-Aligned Group on Women's Integration to Development in Havana, Cuba; the Permanent Conference on Women's Integration to Development in Latin America, the Commission of Labor for the Elaboration of the Preliminary Basic Plan, the Intergovernmental Regional Meeting on the Environment of Latin America and the Caribbean as well as the Intergovernmental Meeting on the Environmental Action Plan of the Caribbean.

Her diplomatic missions abroad includes posts as Consul of Mexico in Laredo, Houston, and El Paso, Texas. She has also headed the General Consulates in Seattle, Washington; Miami, Florida; Los Angeles, California; and San Antonio, Texas.

Ambassador Lara's final post in government was secretary of industrial development of the State of Chihuahua. She is also a member of the editorial board of the Chihuahua Herald and author of the book Chihuahua: Una Experiencia (Chihuahua: An Experience). She is married to Pedro Sarkis, brother of the late Lebanese president Elias Sarkis.
