= Lara Stein =

South African–American entrepreneur and executive

- Born: Johannesburg, South Africa
- Education: Emerson College
- Occupations: Entrepreneur; executive; strategist
- Known for: Founder of TEDx; global expansion and systems design in technology, education, and civic innovation

Lara Stein is a South African–American entrepreneur and executive known for founding TEDx, a global platform for innovation and education, and for leading large-scale international expansion across technology, learning, and civic systems. She is the founder of Regenerative Consulting, where she advises financial institutions, philanthropies, cultural organizations, and technology partners on systems design, strategy, and the scaling of regenerative and civic-focused initiatives. Stein has held senior leadership roles at TED, Boma Global, Singularity University, MIT, and Women's March Global.

== Life ==
Stein was born in Johannesburg, South Africa, and later moved to the United States. She studied at Emerson College. She resides in New York City with her 3 children. She is Jewish.

== Career ==
=== Early career in media and technology ===
Stein began her career at WGBH in Boston, producing educational and children's animated programming. She later held senior management roles at Microsoft’s MSN, Marvel, Nelvana, and the digital agency iXL, where she founded and led the company's New York office. She subsequently served as President of iXL's eTV/Broadband division, overseeing broadband content, digital strategy, and next-generation platform development.

Stein also produced documentary films and consulted for media and technology organizations including Pangea Day, Worldwide Biggies, Moveopolis, and JVP.

=== TED and TEDx ===
In 2009, Stein joined TED to develop a licensing program for independently organized TED-style gatherings. She founded the TEDx program, conceptualizing its global structure and overseeing strategy, operations, and governance during its formative years.

Under her leadership, TEDx expanded into a worldwide infrastructure enabling thousands of organizers to convene community-led innovation and education programming. The initiative grew to more than 8,000 TEDx groups in over 130 countries, producing tens of thousands of talks.

Stein also launched:

- TEDxWomen, focused on women's representation and leadership
- TEDxYouth, designed for school-age audiences
- TEDx in a Box, enabling convenings in low-resource communities

As director of the TED Prize, she led its restructuring, expanded the award size, and contributed to operational foundations later used in the development of the Audacious Project.

=== Global leadership roles ===
==== Singularity University ====
Stein served as Managing Director for Global Expansion at Singularity University, overseeing international summits, chapters, innovation hubs, and partnerships across multiple regions.

==== Women's March Global ====
As Executive Director of Women's March Global, Stein developed the movement's international structure and coordinated advocacy and organizing across more than 100 countries.

==== MIT ReACT ====
Stein acted as the interim Executive Director of MIT ReACT, an MIT initiative providing global educational pathways and credentialed programs for refugees and displaced learners.

==== Boma Global ====
Stein founded and served as CEO of Boma Global, a global leadership and learning network focused on ethics-based leadership, innovation and sustainability education. She continues to serve as a board member and advisor.

=== Regenerative systems, civic innovation, and climate initiatives ===
Through Regenerative Consulting, Stein works with funders, cultural institutions, governments, and technology organizations on:

- regenerative economic and investment models
- systems design and organizational strategy
- civic infrastructure and public-interest technology
- narrative strategy and movement design
- global platform and expansion architecture

Her clients have included leading philanthropies and family offices (Bedari Collective, MJF); cultural institutions (Qatar Museums Authority); policy-driven and civic organizations (Future US, Stand Together); and innovation and education partners including MIT's Center for Constructive Communication and Cortico.

Stein participated in the XPRIZE Visioneering Braintrust, where her “WALL-E Prize,” focused on circular materials recovery and trash-to-value innovation, was selected for further prize design development.

She also co-conceptualized ReGenDAO, a global community exploring regenerative finance and governance models.

== Boards and advisory roles ==
Stein currently serves on the boards of:

- Equality Now
- CorpsAfrica
- XPRIZE Visioneering Braintrust

She previously served on the boards of:

- Lalela
- The We Are Family Foundation
- The Lung Cancer Research Foundation

== Recognition ==
Stein has been recognized in several technology and media publications, including the Silicon Alley Reporter “Top 100 Executives,” Alley Cat News “Top Women of Silicon Alley,” and Who’s Who Among Outstanding Female Executives.
