= Lara Jakes =

American journalist

- Born: July 8, 1973 (age 53)
- Other names: Lara Jakes Jordan, Lara Jakes Jason
- Education: Missouri School of Journalism (BA)
- Occupation: Journalist
- Years active: 1995–present

Lara Jakes (born July 8, 1973) is an American journalist. She currently serves as the diplomatic correspondent for the Washington bureau of The New York Times. Her career has concentrated on international security with a focus on conflict reporting. Jakes has reported from more than 40 countries and covered war and sectarian strife in Iraq, Afghanistan, Israel, the West Bank and Northern Ireland.

== Education ==
Jakes graduated with a Bachelor in Journalism in 1995 from the University of Missouri School of Journalism.

== Career ==
Jakes is currently the diplomatic correspondent for The New York Times. Prior to this post she was the foreign policy editor at the Times Washington D.C. bureau.^{[3]} From 2017 to 2019 Jakes was the deputy managing editor and then managing editor for news at Foreign Policy magazine. She co-authored "The American Pope," which was published by the Vatican in 2016. Prior to that, she worked for the Associated Press for more than 12 years, including as Baghdad bureau chief and as a national security writer. Earlier, she was a national correspondent for Hearst Newspapers and worked at the Times Union in Albany, N.Y.

Jakes has extensive experience on the ground in Iraq reporting on insurgent attacks as well as military and diplomatic relations between the United States and Iraq. She was present during the transition and draw down of US Troops in 2011. Remaining for a year after the withdraw allowed her to report on the people and culture of Iraq after nine years of conflict. Jakes reports that understanding Iraqi customs changed with way she reported on the country. She described the responsibility news organizations have to cover how United States policies impact people around the globe. In January 2020, Jakes described negotiating hostile conversations while reporting on the Trump Administration as "reporters jobs are to ask the hard questions of public officials; it's all about accountability."

=== Book ===
Jakes provided analysis for the book, The American Pope (Vatican Press, 2016). The book gathers the three most important speeches delivered by Pope Francis during his visit to Cuba and the United States in 2015. Jakes was approached by co-author Paolo Messa to write about Pope Francis's visit to Washington. Her contribution focused on the impact of his visit on American politicians and the importance of his message. Jakes wrote of his speech to the joint session of the Congress of the United States of America in Washington, D.C., on September 24, 2015, that Pope Francis evoked the memory of "Lincoln: freedom; Martin Luther King: freedom in diversity and non-exclusion; Dorothy Day: social justice and the rights of persons; and Thomas Merton: capacity for dialogue and openness to God.”

== Personal life ==
Jakes is married to Col. Mike Jason (U.S. Army, Retired.). They live in Alexandria, Virginia and have 1 daughter. Jakes and Jason have written about the impact of war zone engagement and Post Traumatic Stress Syndrome (PTSD) for both military and embedded journalist. Jakes is an avid runner.
