= Lara Habib Chamat =

Lebanese news presenter

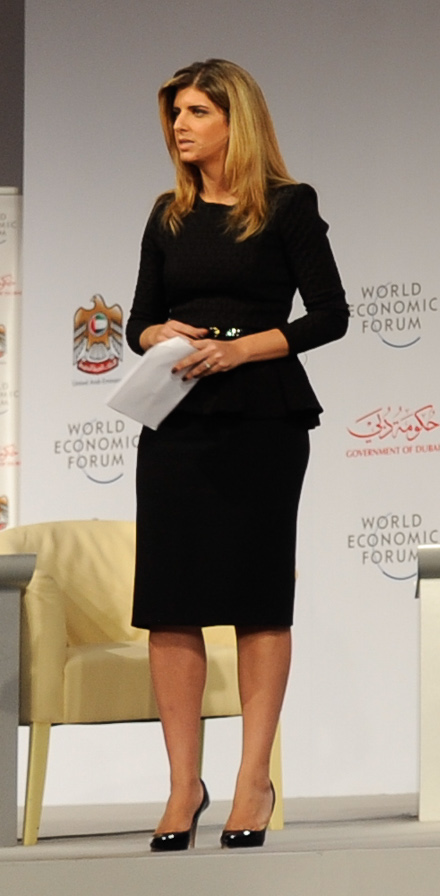
- Habib moderating a televised panel discussion at the World Economic Forum Summit on the Global Agenda in 2012
- Born: November 13, 1980 (age 45); Kousba, Lebanon
- Occupation: Al Arabiya News Channel
- Notable credit: Al Arabiya

Lara Habib Chamat (Arabic: لارا حبيب شامات, born 13 November 1980) is a Lebanese Senior Business News presenter on Al Arabiya News Channel.

== Biography ==
Lara, born in Kousba, Koura District, is of Lebanese origin, studied banking and finance as an undergraduate and holds an MBA from the Lebanese American University (LAU), in Beirut.

== Career ==
Lara started her career as a research analyst in Blom Bank, which is one of the largest Lebanese banks, and worked there for 3 years. She then moved to CNBC Arabiya (CNBC Arabiya is the only 24-hour Arabic language financial and business information television channel. It covers regional and international affairs from an Arab economic perspective) where she presented the main business programs for two years.

Lara joined Al Arabiya News Channel in 2006 as the presenter and producer of Aswaq al-Kuwait, which was a weekly program that tackled sensitive topics in the Kuwaiti market. Simultaneously, she reported daily on the stock market and the major economic developments.

She moved back to Dubai in 2008 to present "Aswaq al-Arabiya" programs, which are the main business bulletins that follow the daily performance of the Arab and international stock markets. The show hosts daily decision makers and CEOs of top companies.

During the course of her work, Habib covered several conferences which include the annual International Monetary Fund-World Bank meetings, the 3rd Organization of Petroleum Exporting Countries Summit, the 8th Cooperation Council for the Arab States of the Gulf Banking Conference, the 3rd World Future Energy Summit and the 4th Global Competitiveness Forum.

She has also interviewed some of the most influential people in the local and international business world including The Former International Monetary Fund Managing Director Dominique Strauss-Kahn, World Bank president Robert Zoellick, former World Bank president James Wolfenson, Sama Governor Dr. Mohammed Al-Jasser, Head of Kuwait Investment Authority Mr Badr Al-Saad and Emaar Chairman Mohammed Al-Abbar.
