= Trojan Vision =

- Current Trojan Vision logo
- Country: United States
- Headquarters: Los Angeles

Programming
- Language: English
- Picture format: 1080i (HDTV)

Ownership
- Owner: University of Southern California; School of Cinematic Arts

History
- Launched: September 15, 1997

Links
- Website: trojanvision.com

Trojan Vision is a student television station at the University of Southern California through the School of Cinematic Arts. Established in 1997, Trojan Vision broadcasts 24/7 from the Robert Zemeckis Center for Digital Arts to the University Park Campus on Channel 8.1 and online through their website. Programming is made available to the greater Los Angeles community on local channel LA36.

Students can volunteer at Trojan Vision or earn credit through the USC School of Cinematic Arts course CTPR-409 "Practicum in Television Production."

In 2017 Trojan Vision celebrated its 20th year on the air.

== Programming ==
Trojan Vision has featured a wide variety of shows since its launch in 1997.

=== Technical details ===
Trojan Vision's primary broadcast studio, Studio B, is located at the Robert Zemeckis Center for Digital Arts. Studio B is equipped with four professional video cameras:. The studio has Strand lighting control and teleprompters. The video control room includes a BlackMagic Design ATEM video switcher. The audio room contains a MIDI keyboard, a sampler, and a Yamaha O2R mixer with integrated effects. These rooms export their signals to TV8 Master Control where they are recorded on video servers, broadcast live in HD on the campus cable TV system and streamed online.

In addition to Studio B, Trojan Vision has access to other stages in the Zemeckis Center. These include a 30x30 insert stage, a 30x40 stage with standing sets, and two 40x50 stages that can be combined, forming a 40x100 sound stage. During Summer 2012 Trojan Vision attained exclusive access to Studio C.

For field use, Trojan Vision uses Sony XDCAMs and other cameras.

Trojan Vision operates a single-mode fiber optic network, enabling it to do live TV broadcasts from many locations on the USC campus, including the USC Annenberg School for Communication and Journalism and various theaters and stages at the USC School of Cinematic Arts. The station also broadcasts 24/7 from an 80-inch LCD screen at a Trojan Vision-branded kiosk on campus located adjacent to Tommy Trojan.

== Awards and honors ==
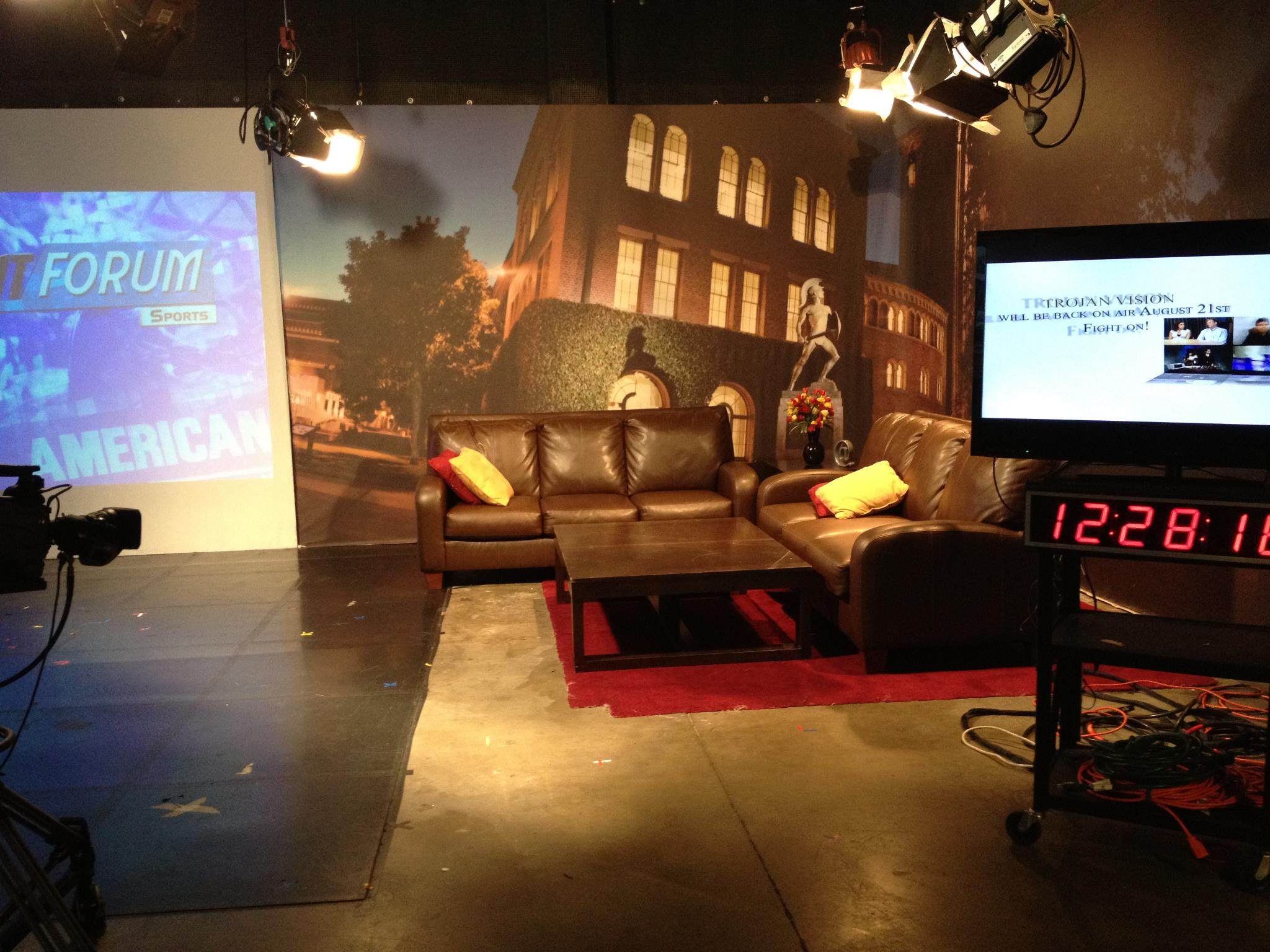
Trojan Vision Studio B

In 2006, Trojan Vision Trojan received a Telly Award for the third year in a row. The award, which honors "outstanding local, regional, and cable television commercials and programs" has been awarded to Trojan Vision 4 times since 2004. Trojan Vision has received several other awards, including being named Spin Magazine's, "Best College Television Station in the Country," and being presented with six Telly's.

== Previous logos ==
Previous version of Trojan Vision logo
