= Lara Klaes =

German politician (born 1997)

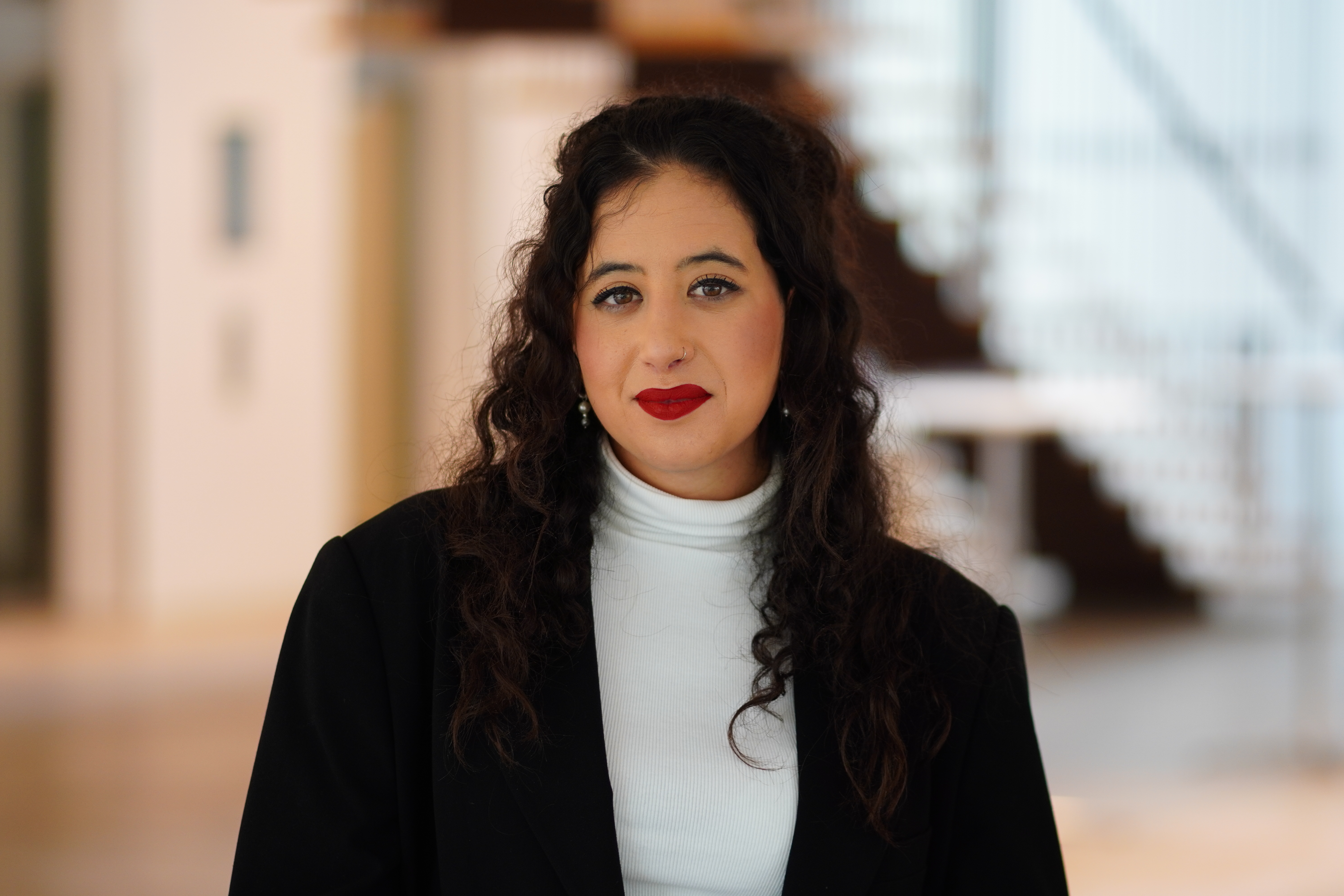
- Klaes in 2025

Member of the Landtag of Hesse
- Incumbent
- Assumed office 18 January 2024

Personal details
- Born: 24 February 1997 (age 29) Neuwied
- Party: Alliance 90/The Greens (since 2018)

Lara Klaes (born 24 February 1997 in Neuwied) is a German politician serving as a member of the Landtag of Hesse since 2024. From 2021 to 2022, she served as spokesperson of the Green Youth in Hesse.
