= Limner =

Painter, generally of miniatures or of portraits

A limner is an illuminator of manuscripts, or more generally, a painter of ornamental decoration. A mention of medieval limners' work appears in the book Methods and Materials of Painting by Charles Lock Eastlake (1793–1865).

"The treatises [on oil painting] cannot be placed later than the thirteenth, or beginning of the fourteenth, century. This was the age of Dante, and 'the art which in Paris was called illuminating' (limning) is well illustrated by such guides." p. 45

== United Kingdom ==
In London in the mid-19th century the limner David Laurent de Lara established himself as a modern illuminator of manuscripts and documents. His work broke new ground and helped establish the idea of illumination as a contemporary artform in its own right, rather than as a historical artform.

The office of His Majesty's Painter and Limner is a position within the Royal Household unique to Scotland. It was last held by Dame Elizabeth Blackadder until her death in 2021. The position of portrait painter to the royal household is honorary and for life.

== United States ==
In early 19th-century America, a limner artist was one who had little if any formal training and would travel from place to place to solicit commissions.

Among colonial America's rising mercantile class, a limner was an unattributed portrait commissioned as a status symbol. The local landowners and merchants who commissioned these portraits posed in their finest clothes, in well-appointed interiors, or in landscapes that identified their position, property, good taste, and sophistication.

A late named artist who began in this genre is the Maine landscape artist Charles Codman, who in Eastern Argus (April 1, 1831) is described as an "ornamental and sign painter" or "limner" who practiced "Military, Standard, Fancy, Ornamental, Masonic and Sign Painting".

== Canada ==
The Victoria Limners Society was a group of artists working in Victoria, British Columbia from 1971 through 2008. They worked within a variety of artistic styles and mediums, such as painting, sculpting, pottery, and other forms of visual art. The artists include Maxwell Bates, Pat Martin Bates, Richard Ciccimarra, Robert De Castro, Colin Graham, Helga Grove, Jan Grove, Elza Mayhew, Myfanwy Pavelic, Carole Sabiston, Herbert Siebner, Robin Skelton, and Karl Spreitz.
