= Lara Petusky Coger =

American journalist

- Education: University of Texas at Austin; USC Annenberg School for Communication and Journalism
- Occupations: freelance print journalist, television producer
- Notable credit: The New York Times

Lara Petusky Coger is an American freelance print journalist and television producer.

Coger has covered the Dominican Republic, Miami, security in the wake of the September 11, 2001 attacks, Cuba and Hurricane Katrina for The New York Times.

Coger was a founding director of the Cine las Americas Festival of New Latin American Cinema in the 1990s.

She is a graduate of the University of Texas at Austin and also holds a graduate degree in Public Diplomacy from the University of Southern California Annenberg School for Communication and Journalism.
