= Lara Juliette Sanders =

German film director, screenwriter and film producer

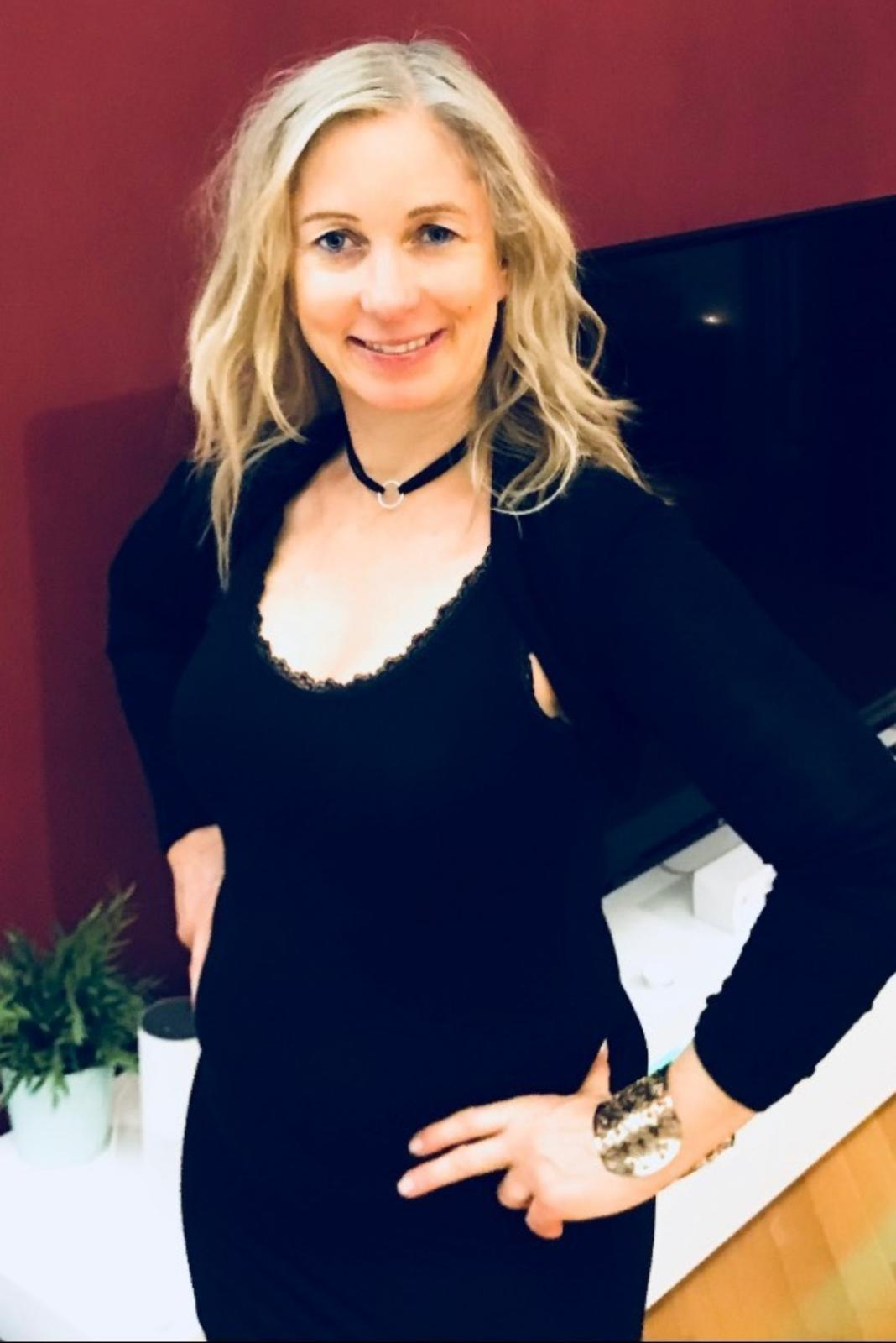
- Born: 1969 (age 56–57)
- Occupations: director, producer and TV personality

Lara Juliette Sanders is a German director, producer and TV personality. She first gained media attention after winning a lifetime achievement award for her period-spanning feature documentary "Celebration of Flight".

== Career ==
Sanders studied communication science and business administration at LMU Munich and worked as a freelance journalist for the Bayerischer Rundfunk and ZDF. From 1996 she worked at Westdeutscher Rundfunk as a producer and host while script supervising at Odeon Film. Subsequently, Sanders was responsible for the development of new television pilots at Teletime TV Production as an executive producer.
In 2000 Sanders left her hometown in Germany and met the Swedish pilot Daniel Rundstroem on the island of Dominica, who is the real-life character of Sander's debut film Celebration of Flight. After filming for over 4 years, the award-winning feature-documentary was completed and broadcast in Germany (ZDF, Arte), Italy (RAI), Sweden (SVT), Finland (YLE), Denmark (DR) Norway (NRK), and France (France2). Lara received widespread acclaim from critics and audiences in regards to her directorial debut.

== Personal life ==
In 2020 Sanders married Eritrean actor and businessman Samuel Mekonnen.

== Selected filmography ==
=== Director and writer ===
- 2016 Truth for Foods
- 2007 The Real Daktari
- 2007 Celebration of Flight

=== Producer ===
- 2016 Truth for Foods
- 2016 Hanna's Sleeping Dogs
- 2007 The Real Daktari
- 2007 Celebration of Flight

== Awards ==
- Special Jury Prize for Celebration of Flight at Barcelona International Film Festival
- Best Documentary award for Celebration of Flight at Gloria Film Festival
- Best Feature Documentary Director's Award for Celebration of Flight at Texas Film Festival
