= Luisa María Lara =

Spanish astrophysicist (born 1966)

- Born: Luisa María Lara López; 9 June 1966 (age 60); Alcalá la Real, Spain
- Education: University of Granada
- Occupation: Astrophysicist
- Employer: Institute of Astrophysics of Andalusia

Luisa María Lara López (born 9 June 1966) is a Spanish astrophysicist. Since 2010, she has been a Spanish National Research Council (CSIC) Researcher at the Institute of Astrophysics of Andalusia in the Solar System Department.

Her line of research deals with the study of planetary and exoplanetary atmospheres and comets through the development of physical-chemical models and remote and in situ exploration of the bodies of the Solar System. Her work has become especially visible thanks to her participation as a researcher on the Rosetta mission for the European Space Agency (ESA).

== Biography ==
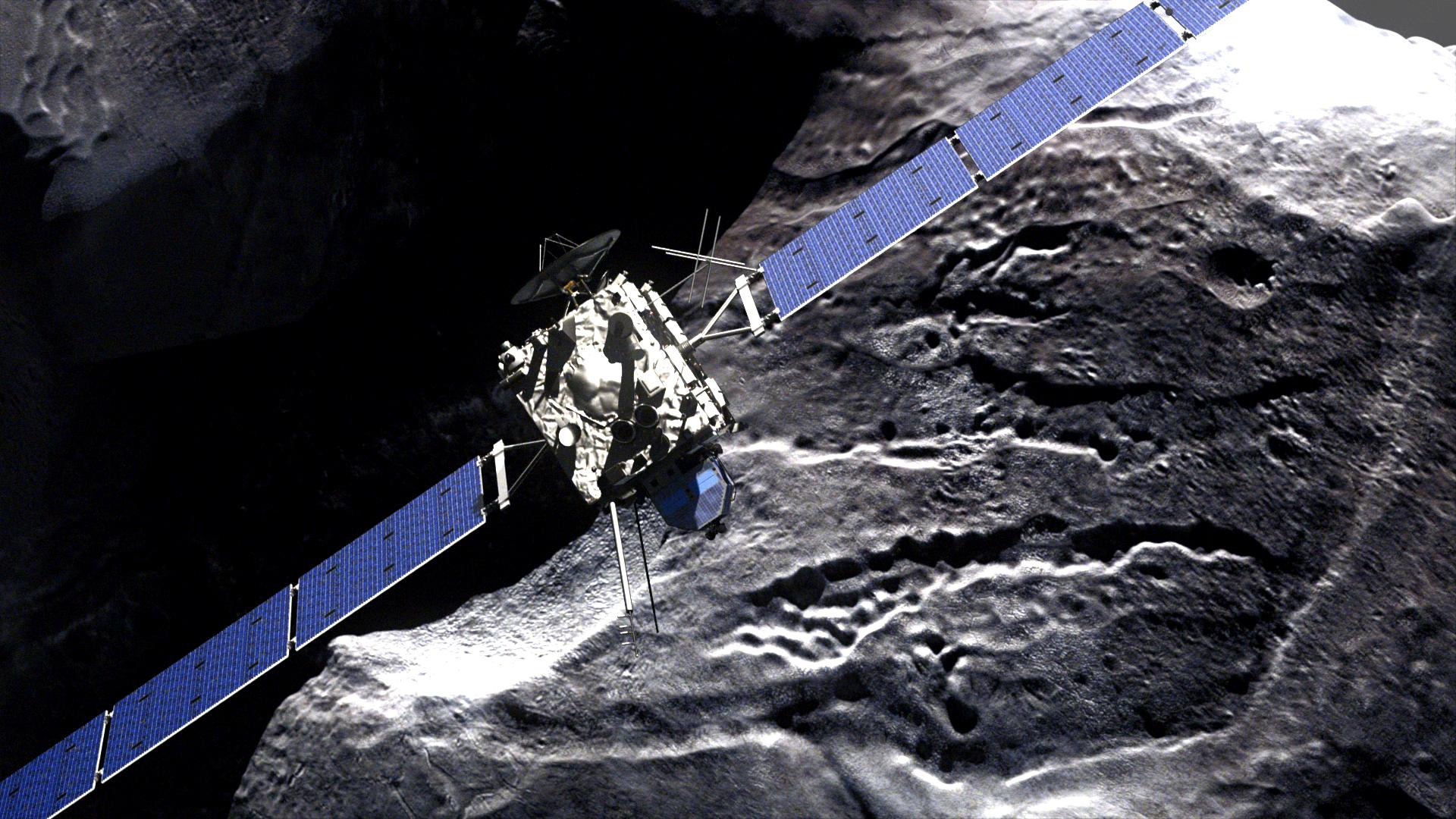
Rosetta

Born in Alcalá la Real, Luisa María Lara attributes her love and pleasure of looking at the sky to her mother, who took advantage of the lack of public lighting in Puerto Lope, a small village in Granada, which allowed greater visibility. She took up astronomy at an early age – at three she was fascinated by the sky, and at seven it was clear that she wanted to devote herself to science and the study of stars. She entertained herself by drawing the different phases of Venus that she saw from the terrace of the house in notebooks.

She attended secondary school in Pinos Puente, took Baccalaureate studies in Íllora, and her University Orientation Course (COU) in Granada. She earned a licentiate in Physical Sciences at the University of Granada in 1989 and received her doctorate in 1993.

Since 2010, she has been a CSIC Scientific Researcher at the Institute of Astrophysics of Andalusia in the Solar System Department. She has worked at various international institutions, such as the Paris Observatory in Meudon, the Max Planck Institute for Solar System Research, ESA, and the National Astronomical Observatory of Japan in Tokyo.

In addition, Lara has developed theoretical models of atmospheric composition to analyze the data acquired by the Herschel Space Observatory (from 2009 to 2013) of Titan, Jupiter, Uranus, and Neptune. These models aim to explain the origin, evolution, and abundance of water vapor (among other compounds), proposing different hypotheses, from vaporization of micrometeoroids to cometary impacts in these atmospheres.

She has been deputy coordinator of the Space Area of the National Evaluation and Forecast Agency (ANEP), as well as participating in national and international committees for the management of space science and technology, such as the ESA Solar System Working Group and the Scientific Committee of the International Space Science Institute.

In 2016 she participated as a scientific and technical researcher on the missions of the space probe Rosetta (ESA) to comet 67P, on BepiColombo (ESA-JAXA) for the exploration of Mercury, and on the Jupiter Icy Moons Explorer (ESA) to study Jupiter and the Galilean moons. Likewise, she has been part of the scientific-technical definition teams of NASA-ESA space missions to the Saturn system, and of an ESA mission to bring asteroidal material to Earth.

She has published over 100 articles in peer-reviewed journals and made more than 250 contributions to international conferences.

== Books ==
- Titán (2010), CSIC, ISBN 978-84-00-09071-5. ¿Qué sabemos de? series #10.
