= Adriana Lara =

Mexican computer scientist

Adriana Lara López is a Mexican computer scientist whose research involves evolutionary computation, memetic algorithms, and multi-objective optimization. She is a professor in the school of physics and mathematics at the Instituto Politécnico Nacional in Mexico.

== Education and career ==
Lara graduated from the Instituto Politécnico Nacional in 2001, and earned a master's degree through CINVESTAV in 2003. She completed her PhD at CINVESTAV in 2012. Her dissertation, Using Gradient Based Information to Build Hybrid Multi-objective Evolutionary Algorithms, was jointly supervised by Oliver Schütze and Carlos A. Coello Coello.

She has been a professor at the IPN since 2003.

== Recognition ==
Lara was elected to the Mexican Academy of Sciences in 2022.
