= Volunteer's dilemma =

Game theory case weighing own/others' sacrifice

The volunteer's dilemma is a game that models a situation in which each player can either make a small sacrifice that benefits everybody, or instead wait in hope of benefiting from someone else's sacrifice.

One example is a scenario in which the electricity supply has failed for an entire neighborhood. All inhabitants know that the electricity company will fix the problem as long as at least one person calls to notify them, at some cost. If no one volunteers, the worst possible outcome is obtained for all participants. If any one person elects to volunteer, the rest benefit by not doing so.

A public good is only produced if at least one person volunteers to pay an arbitrary cost. In this game, bystanders decide independently on whether to sacrifice themselves for the benefit of the group. Because the volunteer receives no benefit, there is a greater incentive for freeriding than to sacrifice oneself for the group. If no one volunteers, everyone loses. The social phenomena of the bystander effect and diffusion of responsibility heavily relate to the volunteer's dilemma.

== Payoff matrix ==
The payoff matrix for the game is shown below:

Volunteer's dilemma payoff matrix (example)
Others Player 1	at least one cooperates	all defect
cooperate	0	0
defect	1	-10

When the volunteer's dilemma takes place between only two players, the game gets the character of the game "chicken". As seen by the payoff matrix, there is no dominant strategy in the volunteer's dilemma. In a mixed-strategy Nash equilibrium, an increase in N players will decrease the likelihood that at least one person volunteers, which is consistent with the bystander effect.

== Examples in real life ==
=== The murder of Kitty Genovese ===
The story of Kitty Genovese is often cited as an example of the volunteer's dilemma. Genovese was stabbed to death outside her apartment building in Queens, New York, in 1964. According to a highly influential New York Times account, dozens of people witnessed the assault but did not intervene because they thought others would contact the police and did not want to incur the personal cost of getting involved. Subsequent investigations have shown the original account to have been unfounded, and although it inspired sound scientific research, its use as a simplistic parable in psychology textbooks has been criticized.

=== The meerkat ===
The meerkat exhibits the volunteer's dilemma in nature. One or more meerkats act as sentries while the others forage for food. If a predator approaches, the sentry meerkat lets out a warning call so the others can burrow to safety. However, the altruism of this meerkat puts it at risk of being discovered by the predator.

== Quantum volunteer's dilemma ==
One significant volunteer's dilemma variant was introduced by Weesie and Franzen in 1998 and involves cost-sharing among volunteers. In this variant of the volunteer's dilemma, if there is no volunteer, all players receive a payoff of 0. If there is at least one volunteer, the reward of b units is distributed to all players. In contrast, the total cost of c units incurred by volunteering is divided equally among all the volunteers. It is shown that for classical mixed strategies setting, there is a unique symmetric Nash equilibrium and it is obtained by setting the probability of volunteering for each player to be the unique root in the open interval (0,1) of the degree-n polynomial $g_n$ given by

$g_n(\alpha) = (1-\alpha)^{n-1} (2n \alpha + 1 - \alpha) - 1$

In 2024, a quantum variant of the classical volunteer's dilemma was introduced with b=2 and c=1. This generalizes the classical setting by allowing players to utilize quantum strategies. This is achieved by employing the Eisert–Wilkens–Lewenstein quantization framework. In this setting, the players receive an entangled n-qubit state with each player controlling one qubit. The decision of each player can be viewed as determining two angles. Symmetric Nash equilibria that attain a payoff value of $2-1/n$ for each player is shown, and each player volunteers at this Nash equilibrium. Furthermore, these Nash equilibria are Pareto optimal. It is shown that the payoff function of Nash equilibria in the quantum setting is higher than the payoff of Nash equilibria in the classical setting.

== See also ==
- Bystander effect
- Civil courage
- Death of Cristina and Violetta Djeordsevic (Italy)
- Death of Wang Yue (China)
- Mamihlapinatapai
- Prisoner's dilemma
- Social loafing
- Tragedy of the Commons
