= Death of Wang Yue =

Chinese accident victim

- Date: October 13, 2011
- Time: 17:30 local time
- Location: Foshan, Guangdong, China
- Filmed by: Closed-circuit television
- Outcome: Death of victim
- Deaths: Wang Yue
- Charges: A van driver charged with hit and run

Wang Yue
- Simplified Chinese: 王悦
- Traditional Chinese: 王悅
Transcriptions
Standard Mandarin
- Hanyu Pinyin: Wáng Yuè
Yue: Cantonese
- Jyutping: wong4 jyut6

Wang Yue (Chinese: 王悦; pinyin: Wáng Yuè), also known as "Little Yue Yue" (Chinese: 小悅悅), was a two-year-old Chinese girl who was run over by a van driver on the afternoon of 13 October 2011, in a narrow road in Foshan, Guangdong. As she lay bleeding and unconscious on the road for more than seven minutes, at least 18 passers-by skirted around her body, ignoring her.

She was eventually helped by a female rubbish scavenger and sent to a hospital for treatment, but succumbed to her injuries and died eight days later. The closed-circuit television recording of the incident was uploaded onto the Internet, and quickly stirred widespread reaction in China and overseas.

Many commentators believed this to be indicative of the moral decline in contemporary Chinese society. However, other commentators credited the high-profile Peng Yu incident in 2006, in which someone who helped an injured accident victim was accused of having injured the victim himself and was forced to pay for the victim's medical bill, as having caused people to fear getting in trouble for helping in Wang's case. Several regional Good Samaritan laws were passed following the incident and in 2017 a new national Good Samaritan law came into force to prevent such situations through the country.

== Crash ==
Wang, who was two years old, wandered away from her home in Foshan while her mother was quickly collecting laundry during a thunderstorm. Closed-circuit television cameras captured the child wandering into a narrow, busy market street. Within a few moments of her appearance on the screen, Wang was struck by a white van, and knocked to the ground and under the van's front wheels. The van driver pauses, but does not get out.

After a moment, he pulls forward slowly, at which time his rear wheel drives over Wang. The driver moves on. Subsequently, at least 18 people walk past her, and fail to assist her, some pausing to stare before moving on. In that time, another large truck runs over Wang's legs with both front and back tires. She is eventually helped by a female rubbish scavenger, Chen Xianmei (Chinese: 陈贤妹). Wang's parents Wang Chichang and Qu Feifei chose not to blame anyone besides themselves for their daughter's death. Qu said, "Granny Chen represents the best of human nature, it's the nicest and most natural side of us."

The drivers of both vehicles were detained by police in the days after the incident on suspicion of causing a traffic crash.

== Trial ==
On 26 May 2012, Hu Jun, who was driving the first minivan that ran over Wang, was put on trial in Foshan and charged with Wang's death. He pleaded guilty to traffic crimes, but not homicide. On 6 September 2012, Hu was convicted of involuntary homicide and sentenced to three and a half years in prison. The sentence was lightened because he turned himself in and had paid part of Wang's medical expenses.

== Public reaction ==
Closed-circuit footage of the incident was broadcast by a local television station, then posted online. The footage sparked worldwide news reports, and triggered dozens of editorials and millions of posts on social media sites, the majority criticizing the callousness and cruelty of those who passed Wang Yue without helping her.

Previously, there had been incidents in China, such as the high-profile Peng Yu incident in 2006, wherein Good Samaritans who helped people injured in crashes were accused of having injured the victim themselves and were forced to pay for the victim's medical bills. Some commentators have explained that this may have caused people to fear getting in trouble for doing the right thing in Wang's case, thus failing to help.

The Communist Party Chief of the Guangdong province, Wang Yang, called the incident "a wake-up call for everybody". The Sina Weibo website attracted more than 4.5 million posts on the incident within a few days and launched a "stop apathy" campaign online. There are also reports that some of the 18 people identified in the camera footage have received harassment, threats, and prank calls since the news broke.

In November 2011, the results of a poll by the China Youth Daily, the official Communist party newspaper for youth, showed that 80% of the young people surveyed said they had been following the case closely, and 88% of those polled thought Wang died because of growing indifference [in China] towards other people. A majority, 71%, also thought the people who passed the child without helping were afraid of getting into trouble themselves. According to an article by Chen Weihua, deputy editor of the China Daily, "Various surveys in the past weeks have shown that the majority of the people polled believe our morals have suffered a major setback in the past decade."

== Aftermath ==
According to China Daily, "At least 10 Party and government departments and organizations in Guangdong, including the province's commission on politics and law, the women's federation, the Academy of Social Sciences, and the Communist Youth League, have started discussions on punishing those who refuse to help people who clearly need it."

Officials of Guangdong province, along with many lawyers and social workers, also held three days of meetings in the provincial capital of Guangzhou to discuss the case. It was reported that various lawmakers of the province were drafting a "Good Samaritan" law, which would "penalize people who fail to help in a situation of this type and indemnify them from lawsuits if their efforts are in vain." Legal experts and the public debated the idea ahead of discussions and a legislative push. On 1 August 2013, the nation's first Good Samaritan law took effect in Shenzhen., followed by a nationwide law in 1 October 2017.

While most attention was focused on the passers-by who failed to assist Wang, a British journalist interviewed other shopkeepers in the Foshan hardware market who were just meters away yet failed to respond. He found that the area where the incident occurred was inhabited mainly by internal migrant families (the Wangs had migrated from Shandong seven years earlier). In the writer's view, there was little sense of community and little in common there. One resident noted, "It is quite sad that we don't really talk to each other."

=== Later incidents ===
While media outlets reported on the perceived Chinese apathy in the aftermath of Wang Yue's death, another incident occurred in Hangzhou when a Chinese woman attempted suicide by drowning in a lake, while local Chinese bystanders gathered at the edge of the lake to watch. After noticing that no one was attempting to rescue the woman, a Uruguayan visitor to China named Maria Fernanda Gomez Arregui swam into the water and saved the woman from drowning. Chinese government officials announced that Maria Fernanda would receive a cash reward of 3000 yuan for her heroic display of "traditional Chinese virtues". The rescue achieved a high profile after the media presented photographs by Wang Ronggui to contrast with the lack of action of bystanders in the death of Wang Yue, and several other similar deaths that occurred around the same time.

Later incidents in China have been continuously compared to the death of Wang Yue. In December 2012, a five-year-old boy named Yan Zhe received crush injuries from a minibus in Zhejiang province. Despite the pleas of the child's mother, other drivers and passers-by refused to help. He was eventually taken to a hospital but died on the way. On the other hand, there have also been numerous reported instances in Chinese and occasionally foreign media of passers-by successfully helping those who are critically injured or in need of assistance, post-COVID era.

== See also ==
- Bystander effect
- Psychopathology of the masses
- Civil courage
- Death of Cristina and Violetta Djeordsevic
- Social loafing
- Volunteer's dilemma
- Good Samaritan law
