= World Day of Remembrance for Road Traffic Victims =

United Nations day

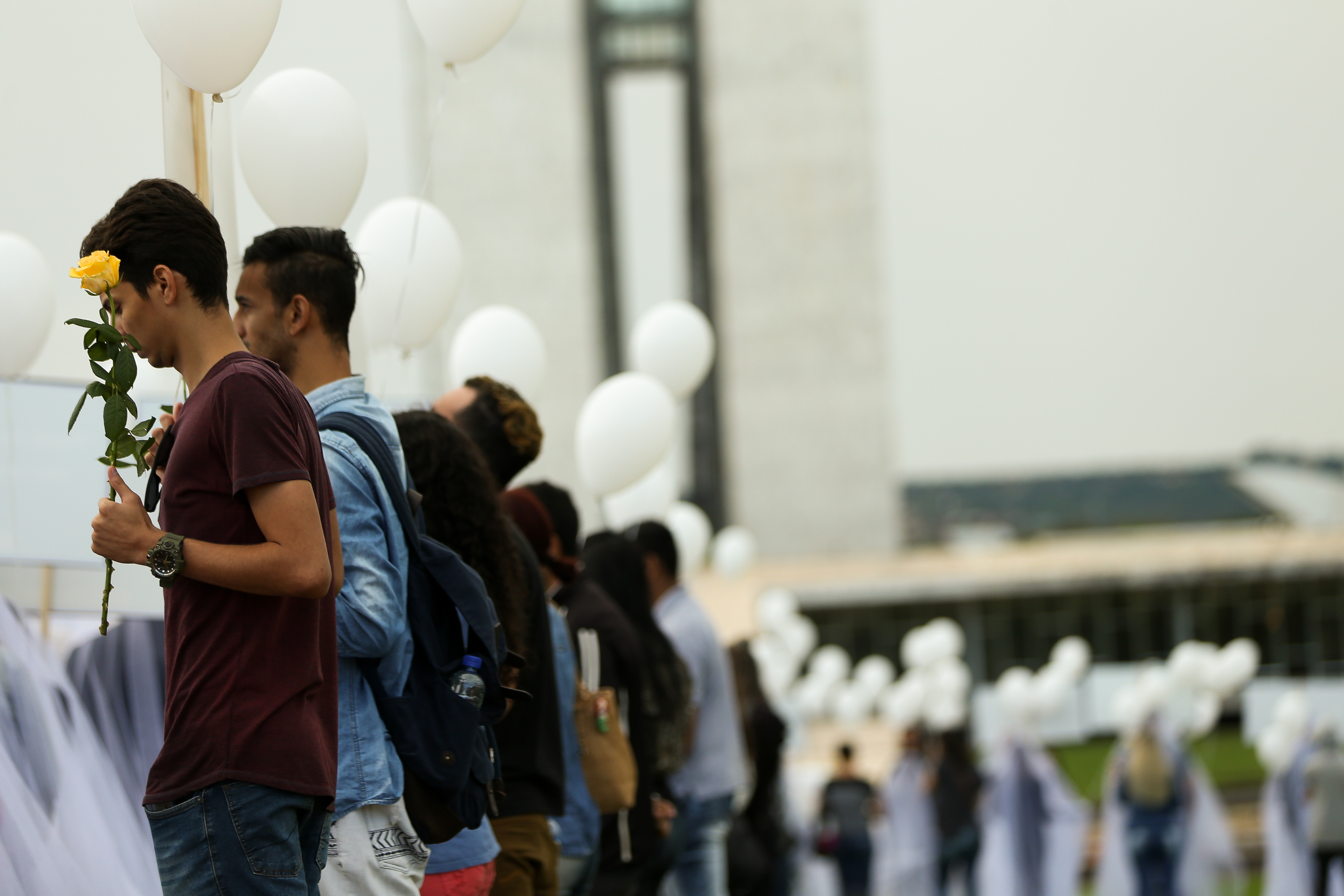
World Day of Remembrance for Road Traffic Victims

The World Day of Remembrance for Road Traffic Victims takes place on the third Sunday in November every year as the appropriate acknowledgment of victims of road traffic crashes and their families. It was started by the British road crash victim charity, RoadPeace, in 1993 and was adopted by the United Nations General Assembly in 2005.

== History ==
In 1993, the first day of remembrance which was organised by Brigitte Chaudhry, Founder of RoadPeace. In 1995 the General Assembly of European Federation of Road Traffic Victims (FEVR) added its support and by 1998 the event was being held in a number of countries including Argentina, Australia, Israel, South Africa, and Trinidad in addition to the United Kingdom. The World Health Organization added its support in 2003 and in 2005 the United Nations General Assembly invited all nations to observe the day 'as the appropriate acknowledgment of victims of road traffic crashes and their families'.

In 2007 events were held in 18 countries; it was marked by candlelight parades in Israel, a multi-faith gathering in Australia, theater performances in Mexico, and a seminar in Japan.

In 2008 events were held 28 countries including Belgium, Croatia, France, Greece, India, Ireland, Italy, Japan, Luxembourg, Mexico, The Netherlands, Philippines, Poland, Portugal, Slovenia, South Africa, Spain, Switzerland, Uganda, UK and USA.

In 2009 events were held in 30 countries. Canada's Transport Minister John Baird offered condolences to those affected by the estimated 3,000 fatalities and 200,000 injuries from road crashes that occur every year in Canada. In England a service was held in Canterbury Cathedral and in Ripon Cathedral Some 1,000 people attended a service in Knock Shrine in Ireland Pope Benedict XVI prayed for "all who have been killed or injured in road accidents". Services were also held in Barbados India, Namibia and many other places.

In 2015, 15 November, FEVR's Former President Brigitte Chaudhry MBE & FEVR's President Jeannot Mersch presented on 15 November 2015 in Brasilia with the ‘Prince Michael of Kent International Road Safety Award‘ for FEVR's "part in the creation, development and promotion of the World Day of Remembrance for Road Traffic Victims over the past two decades".

== Scenario in India ==
Among other countries, India has more fatalities due to road accidents and is also taking steps to reduce the number of accidents. There has been significant amount of awareness events taking place across the country organized by various NGOs taking initiatives to prevent road accidents; several of them failed to sustain and only few remained to work on field level. With the "force of law" that Supreme court of India gave in 2016 for the protection of Good Samaritans through Good Samaritan Law, state governments and NGOs took initiatives to educate about this to public. In Tamil Nadu, an NGO called Thozhan was taking different initiatives such as Traffic Awareness Campaign to transform our country as an Accident Free Nation by creative ways along with Golden Hour training. The GO (Government order) was passed by the state government for this Good Samaritan Law in the consecutive months by the states one by one. The No More - a remembrance day gathering was regularly organized by Thozhan whose work was published in official website of World Day of Remembrance.

=== Commemoration of Gatherings ===
On the remembrance day, the public will gather either in a public place or large indoor hall and the organizer will address the people and give a talk about the need for the day. Then the accident victims' photos will be affixed in a memorial board and homage will be paid either by lighting the candle or floral tribute. The parents or friends of the accident victim will share their experience about the loss due to the accident and emphasis the importance of road safety to the gathered public. Then everyone will take pledge to follow traffic rules and also do their part to prevent further accidents from happening. This gathering will also be an important place to educate the public about Good Samaritan Law and prevent any other accident victim to die on road due to delayed medical treatment or first aid on Golden Hour.

== See also ==
- Road safety

Media related to World Day of Remembrance for Road Traffic Victims at Wikimedia Commons
