= Xu Shoulan v. Peng Yu =

2007 Chinese civil lawsuit

Xu Shoulan v. Peng Yu, also referred to as the Peng Yu case or the Nanjing Peng Yu Incident, was a civil lawsuit in the People's Republic of China, brought before the Nanjing District Court in 2007.

In 2006, 66-year-old Xu Shoulan fell while at a bus stop, breaking her femur. Peng Yu assisted Xu and brought her to a local hospital for further care. Xu accused Peng of having bumped her while exiting a bus and causing her fall, and demanded that he pay her medical expenses. The court decided in favor of the plaintiff and held Peng liable for damages, and included in its judgement the reasoning that: "no one would in good conscience help someone unless they felt guilty".

The verdict received widespread media coverage, and engendered a public outcry against the decision. It is regarded as a landmark case because of its implication that the Chinese public is vulnerable to civil liability for lending help in emergency situations due to the lack of any Good Samaritan laws, and might create a “chilling effect” on bystanders’ willingness to help those in need.

However, with Peng's admission of guilt and resolution of legal proceedings, the financial fraud narrative of the case was proven to be untrue, though in 2015, Melody Young voiced concerns that the chilling effect of Peng's actions on bystander intervention still remained.

== The incident ==
On November 20, 2006, Peng Yu encountered Xu Shoulan, an elderly lady, after she had disembarked from a city bus and fallen. Peng brought Xu to the hospital, and contributed 200 RMB towards her treatment. At the hospital, Xu was diagnosed with a fractured femur and was told that she would have to undergo femur replacement surgery. Xu demanded that Peng pay for her medical costs, and when he refused, sued him for personal injury compensation, claiming that he caused her fall. After out-of-court mediation failed, the case was brought before the Gulou District Court in Nanjing on April 1, 2007. In court, Xu claimed that she had seen that Peng bumped into her, whereas Peng maintained that he only approached Xu after he had seen her fall. An eyewitness present at the scene, Chen Erchun, claimed that Xu had inexplicably fallen as she was transferring between two buses. He maintained that Peng had only arrived at the scene after Xu had fallen, and that he himself had assisted the two of them in calling Xu's relatives. These statements were categorically rejected by Xu Shoulan at the third court hearing.

The case concluded with Peng admitting having accidentally pushed Xu as he was getting off the bus, and agreeing to pay her 10,000 yuan compensation in the settlement reached in March 2008. The two sides withdrew their appeals and came to an agreement that they would not disclose details of the case. However, with the consent of both parties, the director of Nanjing Political and Legal Affairs Commission Liu Zhiwei later released details of the case to the public in a local magazine, including details of Peng's admission of guilt and the compensation agreement settled in court. Liu said he was disclosing the agreement because the case had been seriously misunderstood and was said to have been a turning point in moral standards, a position shared by both litigants Peng and Xu, who agreed to the release of information on their case to rectify the initial chilling effect caused by Peng's false initial claim of fraud.

== See also ==
- Bystander effect
- Death of Wang Yue
