= FEVR =

FEVR may refer to:

- European Federation of Road Traffic Victims
- Familial exudative vitreoretinopathy
- Fremont and Elkhorn Valley Railroad
