= Opera Nomadi =

Largest Romani organisation in Italy

- Opera Nomadi
- Founded: 1963
- Type: Non-governmental organization
- Purpose: Romani rights, anti-discrimination, social inclusion
- Headquarters: Italy
- Region served: Italy

Opera Nomadi is Italy's largest Romani organisation. It was founded in 1963 to combat discrimination and prejudice against the Romani people. Hostility towards the Romanies in Italy has been growing in recent years and in 2008 the organisation criticised the indifference of Italian to the deaths of two Roma children on a beach - the organisation said the reaction by those on the beach "showed a terrible lack of sensitivity and respect."

== Collaborations with public bodies ==
On 22 June 2005 it signed a three-year memorandum of understanding with the Ministry of Education, University and Research for the protection of Gypsy, nomadic and traveling minors, in which the ministry was committed, among other things, to promote initiatives to combat early school-leaving and early school-leaving for Roma, Sinti and Camminanti minors, to promote their integration and to promote the training and updating of teachers and operators.

On 23 June 2005, the representatives of the association participated in a hearing at the Parliamentary Commission for Children, as part of a fact-finding survey on children in a state of abandonment or semi-abandonment and on the forms for its protection and reception.

On 10 May 2007, the Veneto Regional Coordination of Opera Nomadi signed a Memorandum of Understanding with the Regional School Office for Veneto which provides, among its general objectives, the sensitization and qualification of school staff, the involvement of the families of Sinti, Roma and walking students and the implementation of awareness-raising initiatives among the Veneto population on the problems of their inclusion in school.
