= Duty to rescue =

Concept in tort law and criminal law

A duty to rescue is a concept in tort law and criminal law that arises in a number of cases, describing a circumstance in which a party can be held liable for failing to come to the rescue of another party who could face potential injury or death without being rescued. The exact extent of the duty varies greatly between different jurisdictions. In common law systems, it is rarely formalized in statutes which would bring the penalty of law down upon those who fail to rescue. This does not necessarily obviate a moral duty to rescue: though law is binding and carries government-authorized sanctions and awarded civil penalties, there are also separate ethical arguments for a duty to rescue even where law does not punish failure to rescue.

== Common law system ==
In the common law of most English-speaking countries, there is no general duty to come to the rescue of another. Generally, a person cannot be held liable for doing nothing while another person is in peril. However, such a duty may arise in two situations, with details varying in different jurisdictions:

- A duty to rescue arises where a person creates a hazardous situation which endangers someone; the creator of the hazard – who may not necessarily have been a negligent tortfeasor – has a duty to rescue the individual in peril.
- Such a duty may also arise where a "special relationship" exists. For example:
  - Parents and those acting in loco parentis, such as schools and babysitters, have a duty to rescue minor children in their care.
  - Common carriers (i.e. bus drivers, train conductors, etc.) have a duty to rescue their passengers.
  - Employers have an obligation to rescue employees, under an implied contract theory.
  - In some U.S. jurisdictions, owners of real property have a duty to rescue invitees but not trespassers from all reasonably foreseeable dangers on the property. Other jurisdictions, such as California, extend the duty to rescue to all persons who enter upon real property regardless whether they are classified as invitees, social guests or trespassers.
  - Spouses have a duty to rescue each other in all U.S. jurisdictions.
  - In the United States, as of 2009, ten states had laws requiring that people at least notify law enforcement or seek aid for strangers in peril under certain conditions: California, Florida, Hawaii, Massachusetts, Minnesota, Ohio, Rhode Island, Vermont, Washington, and Wisconsin. These laws are also referred to as Good Samaritan laws, despite their difference from laws of the same name that protect individuals who try to help another person. These laws are rarely applied, and are generally ignored by citizens and lawmakers.

Where a duty to rescue arises, the rescuer must generally act with reasonable care, and can be held liable for injuries caused by a reckless rescue attempt. However, many states have limited or removed liability from rescuers in such circumstances, particularly where the rescuer is an emergency worker. Rescuers need not endanger themselves.

== Civil law system ==
Many civil law systems, which are common in Continental Europe, Latin America and much of Africa, impose a far more extensive duty to rescue. The duty is usually limited to doing what is "reasonable". In particular, a helper need not substantially endanger themself.

This can mean that anyone who finds someone in need of medical help must take all reasonable steps to seek medical care and render best-effort first aid. For example, after a traffic accident which causes injury, other drivers and passers-by must help or summon emergency assistance if they can do so without endangering themselves, without regard to personal reasons not to help (e.g. having an urgent appointment).

As an example of such a law in a civil law jurisdiction, in 2016 a man collapsed in a bank lobby in Essen, Germany and later died. Several customers stepped over him without providing assistance; one phoned emergency services. With the help of security camera footage, the customers who did not act were identified and fined several thousand euros for failing to provide assistance. The customer who phoned emergency services was not indicted.

== Shipping ==
A duty to rescue arises under international shipping law. A ship that is in a position to provide assistance to persons in distress at sea must do so. The requirement is found in the United Nations Convention on the Law of the Sea and represents customary international law.

== Regulations by country ==
Duty to rescue law Good Samaritan law No duty to rescue, no data on Good Samaritan law No duty to rescue or Good Samaritan law

In some countries, there exists a legal requirement for citizens to assist people in distress, unless doing so would put themselves or others in harm's way. Citizens are often required to, at minimum, call the local emergency number, unless doing so would be harmful, in which case the authorities should be contacted when the harmful situation has been removed. As of 2012, there were such laws in several countries, including Albania, Andorra, Argentina, Austria, Belgium, Brazil, Bulgaria, Croatia, Czech Republic, Denmark, Estonia, Finland, France, Germany, Greece, Hungary, Iceland, Israel, Italy, the Netherlands, Norway, Poland, Portugal, Russia, Serbia, Slovakia, Slovenia, Spain, Switzerland and Tunisia.

Some countries that do not implement a duty to rescue have laws protecting people who provide assistance from being sued for inadvertently causing harm. These laws are often referred to as Good Samaritan laws.

=== Argentina ===
Argentina has legislation on "abandonment of persons", Articles 106–108 of the Argentine Penal Code, which includes the provision in Article 106 that "a person who endangers the life or health of another, either by putting a person in jeopardy or abandoning to their fate a person unable to cope alone who must be cared for ... will be imprisoned for between 2 and 6 years" [emphasis added].

=== Belgium ===
In Belgium, the obligation to provide assistance was introduced by the law of January 6, 1961.

Failure to provide assistance is punishable under article 422bis of the Penal Code.

The conditions of the duty to help relate to two main points:

- knowledge of a hazard;
- the possibility of helping without putting oneself in physical danger.

Non-assistance is punished by up to one year in prison.

=== Brazil ===
Article 135 of the Brazilian Penal Code, entitled "Omission of rescue", punishes both "failing to succor, when possible to do so absent personal risk, a forsaken or stray child, or an incapacitated, wounded or helpless person (or one in severe or imminent peril)" and "not requesting, in those cases, the aid of public authority", with one to six months of imprisonment, or a fine, with the penalty increased in half if the omission results in injury, and threefold if in death.

=== Canada ===
In Quebec, which makes use of civil law, there is a general duty to rescue in its Charter of Rights: "Every human being whose life is in peril has a right to assistance...Every person must come to the aid of anyone whose life is in peril, either personally or calling for aid, by giving him the necessary and immediate physical assistance, unless it involves danger to himself or a third person, or he has another valid reason." Criminal law in Canada is under the exclusive jurisdiction of the federal government, so failure to comply with an article of the Charter in Quebec does not constitute a criminal offence except if by doing so a party also violates the Criminal Code.

Other provinces follow common law.

=== Czech Republic ===
The Czech Criminal Code requires all persons to provide assistance to anyone who is in risk of death or appears to be lifeless or shows signs of a major health condition or other serious illness, unless providing it would put the assisting person or other persons at risk (§150).

Drivers of vehicles involved in traffic accidents are obliged to provide aid to other parties involved, unless assisting would pose an imminent danger to them or other persons under §151.

Violations are punishable by up to 2 years (§150, par. 1), 3 years if the convicted is expected, by the nature of their job (even when off duty), to save the life of another (§ 150, par. 2) or 5 years (§151). Depending on the circumstances, a driving ban or a prohibition of activity (banning an individual from certain occupations) an adequate alternative to imprisonment.

=== Denmark ===
Under the Danish penal code, all persons must provide aid to the best of their ability to any person who appears to be lifeless or in mortal danger (§ 253), must alert authorities or take similar steps to prevent impending disasters that could cause loss of life (§ 185), must comply with all reasonable requests of assistance by a public authority when a person's life, health or well-being is at stake (§ 142), and must, if they learn of a planned crime against the state, human life or well-being, or significant public goods, do everything in their power to prevent or mitigate the crime, including but not limited to reporting it to authorities (§ 141), in all cases provided that acting would not incur particular danger or personal sacrifice.

Violations are punishable by up to three months (§ 142), two years (§ 185 and § 253) or three years (§ 141) in prison. Before 2004, the maximum penalty for § 185 and § 253 was only 4 and 3 months, respectively.

Outside hit-and-run incidents, § 253 is used only rarely, though a notable 2014 case saw a woman sentenced to a year in prison for abandoning another woman; the abandoned woman had become stuck in a bog and eventually died from exposure.

=== France ===
Anyone who fails to render assistance to a person in danger will be found liable before French Courts (civil and criminal liability). The penalty for this offence in criminal courts is imprisonment and a fine (under article 223–6 of the Criminal Code) while in civil courts judges will order payment of pecuniary compensation to the victims.

The photographers at the scene of the fatal car collision of Diana, Princess of Wales, were investigated for violation of the French law of "non-assistance à personne en danger" (failing to provide assistance to a person in danger), which can be punished by up to five years of imprisonment and a fine of up to €75,000.

=== Germany ===
In Germany, unterlassene Hilfeleistung (failure to provide assistance) is a crime under section 323(c) of the German Criminal Code: any person is obligated to provide assistance in case of an accident or general danger if necessary, and is normally immune from prosecution if assistance given in good faith and following the reasonable person's (aka ordinary prudent person's) understanding of required measures turns out to be harmful. Moreover, any individual who hinders a person who is providing or willing to provide assistance to another person in need can also be punished under the same section. If there is a special guarantor position the criminal prosecution can be for omission as active doing according to section 13 of the criminal code. Also the rescuer or responder may not be held liable if the action they should take in order to help is unacceptable for them and they are unable to act (for example when unable to act at the sight of blood). In Germany, knowledge of basic emergency measures and certified attendance of a first aid and CPR course are prerequisites for being granted a driving license.

=== Greece ===
In Greece, a citizen is required by law to provide help to anyone who asks for it in case of a tragedy or public danger, as long as providing help does not endanger him or her personally. According to article 288 of the criminal code, not providing help in those cases can impose a prison sentence of up to 6 months.

=== Israel ===
In 1998, Israel enacted the "Stand-not-idly-by-thy-neighbor's-blood Law", taking its name from Leviticus 19:16. It requires one to render assistance whenever one is in the presence of a person who, due to some sudden occurrence, is in severe and immediate danger to life, limb or health, provided that one can do so without placing oneself or a third party in danger. Notifying the authorities (e.g. the police or fire department, as relevant) or calling on others who can render assistance for aid is considered "rendering assistance" under the law. A person obliged to render assistance who fails to do so can be fined.

=== Japan ===
In Japan, Article 19 (1) of the Medical Practitioners' act asserts that "No medical practitioner who engages in medical practice may refuse any request for medical examination or treatment without legitimate grounds."

However duty to rescue laws are generally limited to health professionals; other citizens are subject to laws closer to the "good samaritan model".

=== Netherlands ===
According to Article 450 of Dutch criminal law: "He who, being a witness to the instantaneous mortal danger of another, fails to provide or procure such help which he can provide or procure without reasonably needing to fear danger to himself or others, will, if the death of the person in need of help occurs, be punished with imprisonment of up to three months or a second category fine."

=== Norway ===
In Norway, Section 287 of the Penal Code states that "A penalty of a fine or imprisonment for a term not exceeding six months shall be applied to any person who fails to provide assistance to the best of his/her ability to a person at obvious risk of losing his/her life or suffering considerable harm to his/her body or health". This is applicable as long as providing help does not endanger him or her personally.

=== Poland ===
In Poland, Article 162 of the criminal code states that whoever does not render aid to a person in a situation posing an imminent danger of death or serious injury to health, and is able to do so without exposing himself or another person to a danger of loss of life or serious injury to health, shall be subject to the penalty of imprisonment for up to 3 years.

A person who fails to render assistance for which it is necessary to undergo a medical procedure, or in circumstances in which immediate assistance from an institution or a person appointed for that purpose is possible, shall not commit an offence.

=== Russia ===
In Russia, Article 125 of the criminal code prohibits knowingly abandoning people who are in life- or health-threatening situations when said people cannot help themselves. However it binds only those who are either legally obligated to care for said people or who themselves have put said people into life or health threatening situation.

=== Serbia ===
In Serbia, a citizen is required by law to provide help to anyone in need (after for example a major car accident) as long as providing help does not endanger him or her personally. Serbian criminal code Articles 126 and 127 state that should one abandon a helpless person and/or not provide aid to a person in need, one could receive a prison sentence of up to one year. If the person dies of injuries due to no aid having been provided by the bystander, a sentence up to 8 years in prison can be imposed.

=== Spain ===
In Spain, a citizen is required by law to provide or seek help to anyone in need as long as providing help does not endanger him or her personally. Not doing so is a criminal offence under Article 195 of the Spanish Criminal Code.

=== Sweden ===
In Sweden, there is no written law explicitly requiring ordinary citizens to provide assistance in crisis situations, as long as this person hasn't been involved in causing the situation. However, there are a couple exceptions: for example, one must warn the public if they discover a hazardous situation (fire, explosives, poisons, etc). Another situation where one is required to provide assistance is when this person has a presumed duty: it would be illegal for someone working as a lifeguard to disregard someone who is drowning, for example.

On the other hand, any third-parties who intervene to help the victim of an ongoing violent crime are provided the same self-defense protections as the original victim.

=== Tunisia ===
In Tunisia, it is regulated by Article 143 of the Tunisian Criminal Code of 1913, modified by the ordinance dated July 9, 1942, relating to the lack of 'legal' assistance (Duty of Rescue). According to the mentioned article, the deliberate failure to assist a person in a dangerous situation (such as injury, fire, or a doctor refusing to provide care) is considered a criminal offense and is punishable by law.

=== United States ===
In Louisiana, all citizens have a duty to provide reasonable care to another person who has suffered serious bodily harm.

=== Vietnam ===
In Vietnam, under Article 132 of the Vietnamese penal code, anyone who sees that another person is in a life-threatening situation, but fail to help them despite being capable of doing so, resulting in their death, shall be subject to warning, non-custodial reform for up to 2 years, or imprisonment from 3 months to 2 years. Offenders can be sentenced to between 1 and 5 years of imprisonment if that person created the dangerous situation or if that person is legally or professionally obligated to help. The penalty rises to 3 to 7 years' imprisonment if two or more people die as a result of the offender's inaction. Offenders may also be banned from holding certain posts, practicing certain professions or doing certain jobs for between 1 and 5 years.

== Ethical justifications ==
Legal requirements for a duty to rescue do not pertain in all nations, states, or localities. However, a moral or ethical duty to rescue may exist even where there is no legal duty to rescue. There are a number of potential justifications for such a duty.

One sort of justification is general and applies regardless of role-related relationships (doctor to patient; firefighter to citizen, etc.). Under this general justification, persons have a duty to rescue other persons in distress by virtue of their common humanity, regardless of the specific skills of the rescuer or the nature of the victim's distress.

These would justify cases of rescue and in fact make such rescue a duty even between strangers. They explain why philosopher Peter Singer suggests that if one saw a child drowning and could intervene to save it, one should do so if the cost is moderate to oneself. Damage to one's clothing or shoes or how late it might make them for a meeting would be insufficient excuse to avoid assistance. Singer goes on to say that one should also attempt to rescue distant strangers, not just nearby children, because globalization has made it possible to do so.

Specific arguments for such a duty to rescue include, but are not limited to:

- The Golden Rule: treat others as one would wish to be treated. This assumes that all persons would wish to be rescued if they were in distress, and so they should in turn rescue those in distress to the best of their abilities. What counts as distress requiring rescue may, of course, differ from person to person, but being trapped or at risk of drowning are emergency situations which this position assumes all humans would wish to be rescued from.
- Utilitarianism: utilitarianism posits that those actions are right which best maximize happiness and reduce suffering ("maximize the good"). Utilitarian reasoning generally supports acts of rescue that contribute to overall happiness and reduced suffering. Rule utilitarianism would look not just at whether individual acts of rescue maximize the good, but whether certain types of acts do so. It then becomes one's duty to perform those types of actions. Generally, having strangers rescue those in distress maximizes good so long as the rescue attempt does not make things worse, so one has a duty to rescue to the best of her or his ability as long as doing so will not worsen the situation.
- Humanity: the rules of humanity advise that the essence of morality and right behavior is tending to human relationships. Therefore, virtues (desirable character traits) such as compassion, sympathy, honesty, and fidelity are to be admired and developed. Acting out of compassion and sympathy will often require rescue where someone is in need. Indeed, it would not be compassionate to ignore someone's need, though the way one fulfills that need may vary. In cases of emergency, rescue would be the most compassionate act compared with allowing a person to remain trapped in rubble.

There are also ethical justifications for role-specific or skill-specific duties of rescue such as those described above under the discussion of U.S. Common Law. Generally, these justifications are rooted in the idea that the best rescues, the most effective rescues, are done by those with special skills. Such persons, when available to rescue, are thus even more required to do so ethically than regular persons who might simply make things worse (for a utilitarian, rescue by a skilled professional in a relevant field would maximize the good even better than rescue by a regular stranger). This particular ethical argument makes sense when considering the ability firefighters to get both themselves and victims safely out of a burning building, or of health care personnel such as physicians, nurses, physician's assistants, and EMTs to provide medical rescue.

These are some of the ethical justifications for a duty to rescue, and they may hold true for both regular citizens and skilled professionals even in the absence of legal requirements to render aid.

== Case law ==
=== United States ===
In an 1898 case Buch v. Amory Mfg. Co., 69 N.H. 257, 44 A. 809, 1897 N.H. LEXIS 49 (N.H. 1898), the New Hampshire Supreme Court unanimously held that after an eight-year-old boy negligently placed his hand in the defendant's machinery, the boy had no right to be rescued by the defendant. Beyond that, the trespassing boy could be held liable for damages to the defendant's machine.

In the 1907 case People v. Beardsley, Carroll Beardsley's mistress, Blanche Burns, passed out after overdosing on morphine. Rather than seek medical attention, Beardsley had a friend hide her in the basement; Burns died a few hours later. Beardsley was tried and convicted of manslaughter for his negligence. However, his conviction was reversed by the Supreme Court of Michigan, which ruled that Beardsley had no legal obligation to her.

The 1981 case Warren v. District of Columbia held that police do not have a legal mandate to protect specific individuals, stating that "the duty to provide public services is owed to the public at large, and, absent a special relationship between the police and an individual, no specific legal duty exists".

Some states, including Minnesota, Vermont, and Rhode Island, legislate that a person who does not intervene safely or call emergency services, if they know that someone is in serious danger, commits a misdemeanor offense.

== See also ==
- Bystander effect – Social psychological theory
- Good Samaritan law – Legal protection for rescuers
- Mandated reporter – People legally required to report abuse
- Omission (law) – Failure to act
- People v. Beardsley – Case that illustrates the parameters around the legal necessity of a duty to act
- Rescue doctrine
- The Finale (Seinfeld): the series finale of the American sitcom Seinfeld depicts the trial of the four main characters of the series for their violation of a duty to rescue (incorrectly called "Good Samaritan law" in the show)
