= People v. Beardsley =

Case that illustrates the parameters around the legal necessity of a duty to act

- Court: Michigan Supreme Court
- Decided: December 10, 1907
- Citation: 150 Mich. 206, 113 N.W. 1128 (1907)

Court membership
- Judges sitting: Aaron V. McAlvay, Robert Morris Montgomery, Russell C. Ostrander, Frank A. Hooker, Joseph B. Moore

Case opinions
- Decision by: McAlvay

Keywords
- Duty to act; Manslaughter

People v. Beardsley 150 Mich. 206, 113 N.W. 1128 (1907) is a well-known case that illustrates the parameters around the legal necessity of a duty to act, and the criminal liability of failure to act when there is an obligation to provide reasonable assistance. In Jones v. United States 308 F.2d 307 (D.C. Cir. 1962), the categories falling under this legal duty were set forth. They include duties based on statute, duties based on contract, duties based on the voluntary assuming of responsibility as for the care of a child, and duties based on legal relationships, such as between parent and child or husband and a wife.

== Circumstances ==
Carroll Beardsley, his wife being out of town, invited a woman, Blanche Burns, to spend the weekend with him in his living quarters. He had an ongoing relationship with Burns and had met with her previously. During this time together, the two of them drank fairly steadily. Without Beardsley's knowledge, Burns obtained some morphine tablets. Beardsley walked in while she was taking the morphine tablets. He slapped the box containing the tablets out of her hand and crushed several on the floor with his foot. Burns picked up and swallowed two of the tablets. Near the time of the expected return of his wife, Beardsley asked a friend to help him carry her to a room of a friend in the basement of Beardsley's house, even though she was in a stupor, and asked the friend to watch out for her and let her out the back way when she was ready, as he was too intoxicated to be of help. Burns died a few hours later.

Beardsley was tried for manslaughter for failure in his duty to act to provide reasonable care to Burns. The prosecutor argued that Beardsley at the time was Burns' natural guardian and had a clear duty to protect her. The defense argued that no such legal duty is created by a moral obligation. None of the categories of legal duty fit the case. The fact that Burns was a woman does not create that same legal duty as a husband has toward a wife or a parent to a child, as the prosecutor sought to infer. Nevertheless, Beardsley was convicted of manslaughter.

== Appeal ==
Beardsley appealed his conviction to the Supreme Court of Michigan and his conviction was reversed. The court found it "repugnant to our moral sense" that a duty would be created because Burns was a woman, as no such moral or legal duty would be implied if she had been a man.

Had this been a case where two men under like circumstances had voluntarily gone on a debauch together and one had attempted suicide, no one would claim that this doctrine of legal duty could be invoked to hold the other criminally responsible for omitting to make effort to rescue his companion.

— Supreme Court of Michigan

== See also ==
- Duty to rescue
