= Car chase =

Chase between automobiles, often involving law enforcement

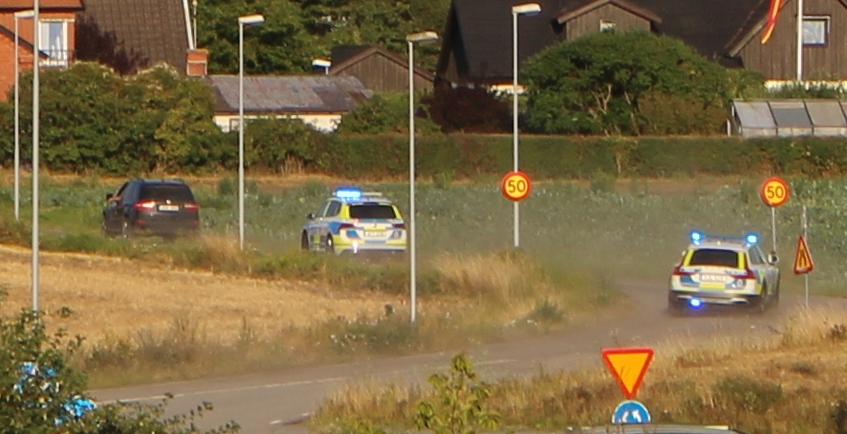
Swedish Police Authority vehicles pursuing a suspect fleeing in a vehicle in 2020

A car chase, police chase or vehicle pursuit is the vehicular overland chase of one party by another, involving at least one automobile or other wheeled motor vehicle, commonly hot pursuit of suspects by law enforcement agency. The rise of the automotive industry in the 20th century increased car ownership, leading to a growing number of criminals attempting to evade police in their own vehicle or a stolen car. Car chases may also involve other parties in pursuit of a criminal suspect or intended victim, or simply in an attempt to make contact with a moving person for non-conflict reasons.

Car chases are often captured on news broadcast due to the video footage recorded by police cars, police motorcycles, and police helicopters participating in the chase. Car chases are also a popular subject with media and audiences due to their intensity, drama and the innate danger of high-speed driving, and thus are common content in fiction, particularly action films and video games.

== Police involvement ==
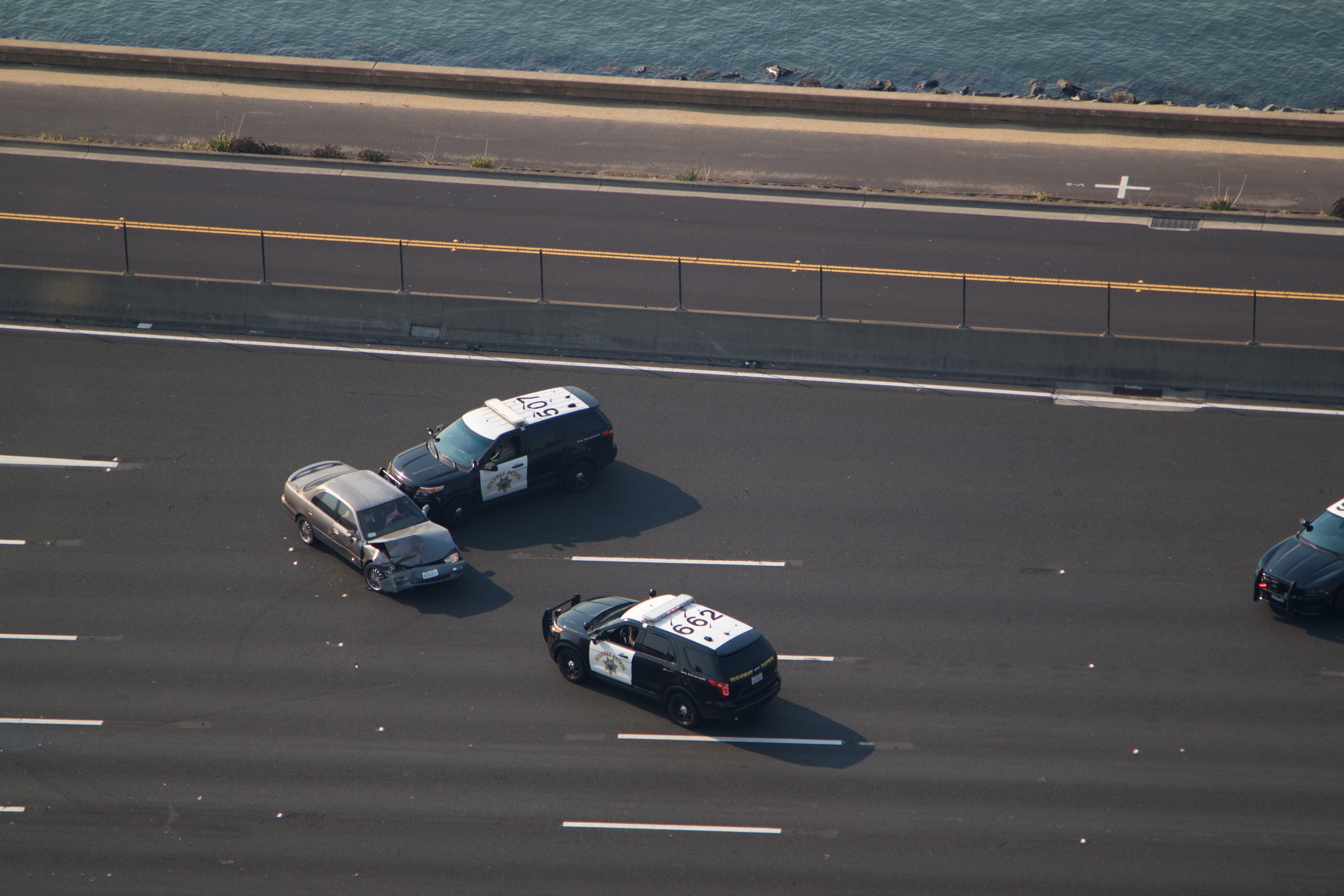
California Highway Patrol cruisers ending a pursuit using a PIT maneuver

Car chases occur when a suspect attempts to use a vehicle to escape from law enforcement attempting to detain or arrest them. The assumed offence committed may range from misdemeanors such as traffic infractions to felonies as serious as murder. When suspects realize they have been spotted by law enforcement, they attempt to lose their pursuer by driving away, usually at high speed. Generally, suspects who police spot committing crimes for which long prison terms are likely upon conviction are much more likely to start car chases.

Police use a number of techniques to end chases, such as ordering the driver to pull over, waiting for the driver's vehicle to crash, overheat, or run out of fuel. More forceful methods include boxing in the vehicle with cruisers, ramming the vehicle, conducting a PIT maneuver, or using spike strips. All efforts, many of which pose risk to all involved as well as bystanders, will be aimed at avoiding danger to civilians. When available, police aircraft may be deployed, which may follow the vehicle from above while ground units may or may not be involved.

=== History ===
Police car chasing a motorcycle in Illinois, which subsequently runs out of fuel

The use of automobiles to evade law enforcement has existed for about as long as the automobile itself; newspaper reports of police chases involving automobiles and motorcycles date back to the 1900s and 1910s. During Prohibition in the United States, bootleggers and moonshine runners often engaged in high-speed chases with police. This led to rise of car modifications intended to outrun the law and auto-racing exhibitions between runners which helped form the sport of stock car racing.

As police forces became more accustomed to chases, they began to adopt police protocol, techniques, and technologies intended to help pursuits more quickly and safely, such as the PIT maneuver in the 1980s and spike strips in the 1990s.

Since the 2010s, as the dangers of car chases become apparent, police have tested various alternative methods of tracking fleeing suspects without continuing to pursue them such as StarChase's GPS trackers or the Grappler bullbar with a tire-catching net. Alternatively, some strategies have centered around simply not pursuing suspect vehicles and instead relying on using vehicle registration to identify the suspect and apprehend them later, though this is ineffective with stolen vehicles.

=== Media coverage ===
The earliest police chase known to be recorded on video in its entirety occurred in May 1988 in Berea, Ohio, when a police officer with a video camera mounted in his cruiser recorded the pursuit of a fleeing suspect vehicle, from the initial attempts to stop the suspect's car to their eventual arrest.

On January 3, 1992, a lengthy pursuit in Southern California, involving a Volkswagen Cabriolet stolen by a suspected murderer, Darren Michael Stroh, who was eventually killed by California Highway Patrol officers in a shootout, became the first police chase to be broadcast live on television, airing on three channels and preempting daytime programs on the station. The chase was reportedly so popular that, when one station switched to a rerun of Matlock, several viewers called in to complain and request they continue airing the chase. This convinced stations to show further live coverage of police pursuits.

In 2002, 700 pursuits were reported in Los Angeles. In 2003, Los Angeles television station KCAL reported a quadrupling of ratings when police pursuits aired. That same year, the Los Angeles Police Department asked news media to reduce coverage of chases, claiming that coverage encourages suspects to flee and may potentially endanger viewers who attempt to view the chase in person.

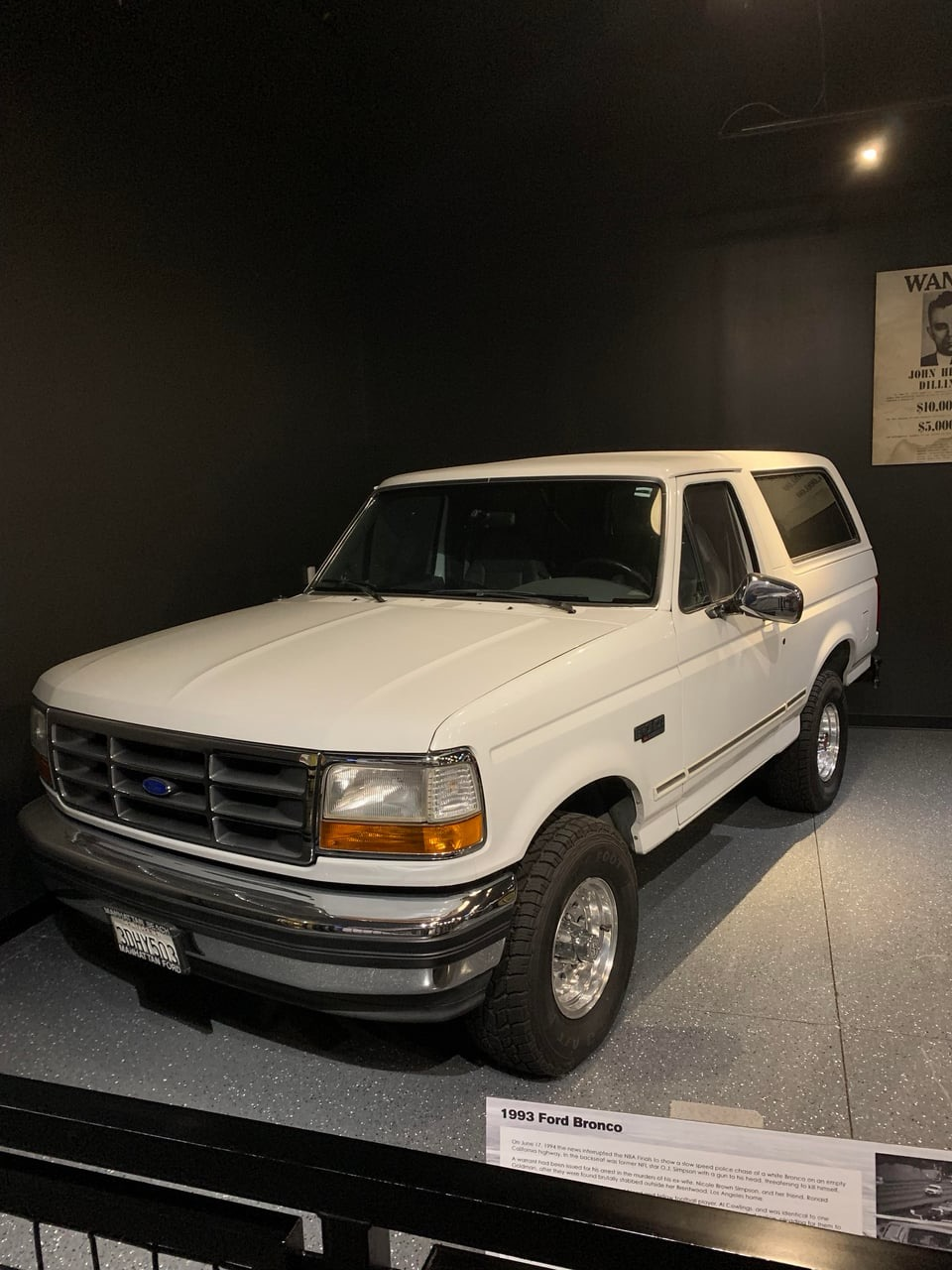
OJ Simpson's Bronco once owned by Al Cowlings at Alcatraz East Crime Museum

Reality television has combined with the car chase genre in a number of television shows and specials such as World's Wildest Police Videos, Most Shocking, and Real TV which often feature real footage of car chases involving suspects fleeing police. In addition, videos and livestreams of car chases are popular content on social media.

On June 17, 1994, former NFL running back O. J. Simpson gained notoriety following national coverage of a low speed chase in his friend Al Cowling's white 1993 Ford Bronco after the murder of his ex-wife Nicole Brown Simpson and Ron Goldman in Los Angeles.

One notable recorded police chase occurred when an M60 Patton tank was stolen by Shawn Nelson from an Army National Guard armory, on May 17, 1995. Nelson went on a rampage through San Diego, California, with the massive tank crushing multiple civilian vehicles before becoming stuck on a road divider. Police were able to mount the tank and open the hatch, killing the suspect when he would not surrender.

On June 4, 2004, welder Marvin Heemeyer went on a rampage in a heavily modified bulldozer in Granby, Colorado, wrecking 13 buildings including the town hall, the public library, a bank, a concrete batch plant, and a house owned by the town's former mayor, resulting in over $7 million in damage. The police were initially powerless, as none of their weapons could penetrate the suspect's vehicle. However, the bulldozer's engine failed and the machine became stuck, so Heemeyer committed suicide by gunshot.

On July 27, 2007 in Phoenix, Arizona, two helicopters collided in mid air while filming a police pursuit. Both were AS-350 AStar news helicopters from the KNXV-TV and KTVK news stations. All four occupants of both aircraft were killed. No one on the ground was injured.

On September 28, 2012, Fox News aired a live police chase in Arizona which ended in the suspect exiting the vehicle and shooting himself after a short foot chase. Fox News was airing it in a five-second delay instead of a normal ten-second delay, which resulted in the shooting being aired on a live broadcast of the Fox Report. Fox anchorman Shepard Smith soon apologized for the broadcast and vowed to never let it happen again.

Live news coverage of police chases is widely associated with the United States and with the city of Los Angeles in particular, which is often described by journalists as "the car chase capital of the world."

=== Risks and legal considerations ===
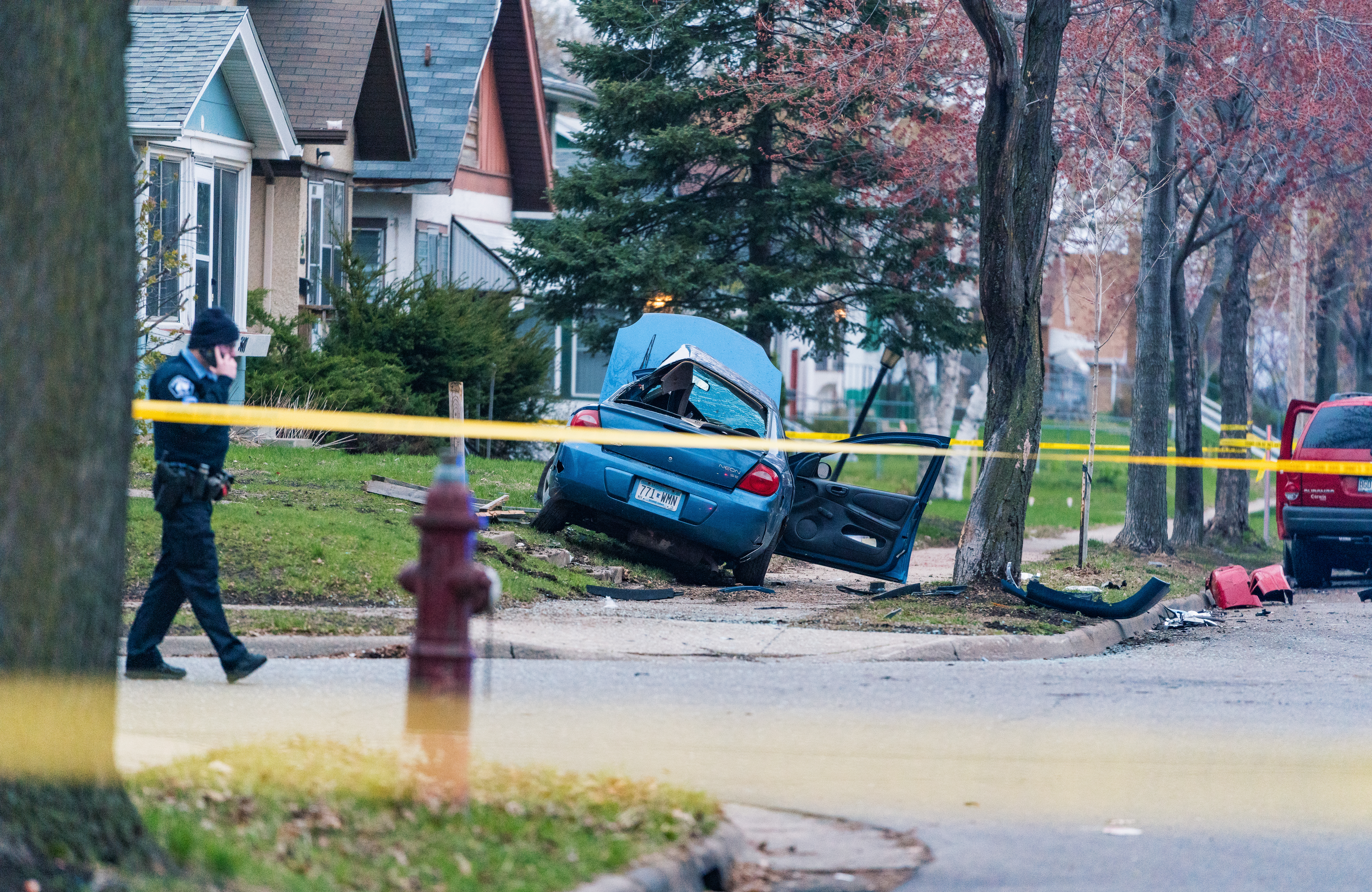
The aftermath of a fatal collision between a suspect and another vehicle following a pursuit in Minneapolis, Minnesota in 2019

High-speed car chases are recognized as a road safety problem, as vehicles not involved in the pursuit, pedestrians or street furniture may be hit by the elusive driver, who will often violate a number of traffic laws, often repeatedly, in their attempt to escape, or by the pursuing police cars. In the United Kingdom, it is estimated that 40 people a year are killed in road traffic incidents involving police, most as a result of a police pursuit. In the United States, chase-related deaths range between 300 and 400 people per year.

The February 2005 Macquarie Fields riots occurred in Sydney, Australia after a local driver crashed a stolen vehicle into a tree, killing his two passengers following a high-speed police pursuit. The death of university student Clea Rose following a police chase in Canberra sparked major recriminations over police pursuit policies.

In 2007, the United States Supreme Court held in Scott v. Harris (550 U.S. 372) that a "police officer's attempt to terminate a dangerous high-speed car chase that threatens the lives of innocent bystanders does not violate the Fourth Amendment, even when it places the fleeing motorist at risk of serious injury or death."

In most common law jurisdictions, the fireman's rule prevents police officers injured in such pursuits from filing civil lawsuits for monetary damages against the fleeing suspects, because such injuries are supposed to be an inherent risk of the job. Public outrage at such immunity has resulted in statutory exceptions. One example is California Civil Code Section 1714.9 (enacted 1982), which reinstates liability where the suspect knew or should have known that the police were present.

Policy on what circumstances justify a high-speed pursuit differ by jurisdiction. Some safety advocates want to restrict risky chases to violent felonies. Another option is to use technology to end or avoid the need for such chases. For example, vehicles can be tracked by aircraft or GPS tagging devices like StarChase, allowing police agencies to reliably intercept suspects using stationary blockades, lower-speed vehicles, or when the vehicle is parked.

A 2023 United States Department of Justice report recommends that police should only initiate a chase only if a violent crime has been committed and the suspect poses an imminent threat to commit another violent crime due to the dangers posed by high speed pursuits. The report also recommends policies that discourage or prohibit pursuits if the suspect is riding a motorcycle.

=== Inter-jurisdictional pursuits and policy issues ===
One particular hazard that is attendant to police pursuits is the problem of multiple law enforcement agencies becoming involved in a car chase that crosses municipal and jurisdictional boundaries. This is often complicated by radio communication incompatibility and policy differences in the various departments involved in a pursuit.

The city of Dallas, Texas was the first major city in the United States to adopt an "Inter-Jurisdictional Pursuit Policy" to address the problems inherent in car chases that involved more than one law enforcement agency. In August 1984, the Dallas Police Department's Planning and Research Division, under the command of Captain Rick Stone, began crafting a policy that more than twenty (20) local law enforcement agencies could agree to abide by when car chases crossed their borders. The result was a model policy that became the standard for use by police departments around the United States.

In Europe, as many national borders no longer have border stations within the Schengen Area, car chases may sometimes cross national boundaries. States often have agreements in place where the police of one state can continue the chase across the national boundary.

== Non-police car chases ==
Some car chases may occur between vehicles that are not involved in law enforcement. These may be conducted by rival criminals, criminals attempting to catch intended victims, vigilantes, or as part of road rage. They may also occur for non-criminal reasons, such as the pursuing vehicle simply attempting to catch up to another vehicle. These car chases are rare and are almost always considered illegal due to the dangers of civilian vehicles, lacking any sort of warning device or authorization, pursuing each other at high speeds.

In 2021, actor Terrence J was pursued and shot at by a vehicle in an attempted robbery. In 2021, a carjacking victim in Chicago pursued a car thief, resulting in an eight-vehicle collision in which the stolen vehicle was destroyed.

== In other countries ==
=== Australia ===
In Australia, Skye's Law is the name of a 2010 law in New South Wales. It is named after a 19-month-old girl, Skye Sassine, who was killed on 31 December 2009 when her family's car was struck by a suspected armed robber who was trying to elude police. The driver was convicted of manslaughter and sentenced to at least 14 years in prison.

=== Germany ===
In Germany, police will chase suspects unless, for example, the fugitive is passing through a densely populated city center. To reduce the risk to uninvolved road users, the chase may be stopped then and the police will attempt to identify and apprehend the perpetrator via other means.

Regulations for dealing with pursuits may be standardized state by state, but in principle, proportionality and the prevention of danger to life and limb take precedence over the interest of repression of crime. German police do not record the number of chases in any official police statistics, so there is little publicly known data on actual chases. However, in 2022 alone, there were 1,164 registered chases in North Rhine-Westphalia; there were 167 recorded in Hamburg in 2020. Chases are frequently reported in the media.

=== United Kingdom ===
In the UK, an estimated 40 people per year die in road traffic incidents involving police, most of them following a chase.

== In film and television ==
In film and television, the term "car chase" refers to a chase scene involving two or more automobiles pursuing one another, which may or may not involve a police car. Feature-length films have been built entirely around car chases, often featuring high-powered exotic vehicles. They are depicted as fast moving scenes with action involving the speed of the vehicles involved, and the potential collisions and the debris resulting from the wreckage.

Staging car chase sequences often requires numerous takes and destruction of several vehicles (whether intentional or mishap). Therefore, it is common to use older vehicles that are 1–2 generations behind the current models on the market, since these can be second-hand acquisitions at low cost due to depreciation. Often for rare models such as the Nissan Skyline GT-R (R34) in Fast & Furious (2009), the more common Nissan Skyline 25GT's (R34) were acquired and modified to look like the GT-R (R34), while in another case a dune buggy was fitted with a GT-R (R34) shell.

There are some exceptions wherein a high-profile vehicle is used, such as the James Bond and Transporter franchises, usually because the vehicles used are "star cars" (i.e. used by the film's protagonists and featured prominently). Vehicle manufacturers may also pay for product placement in a film production, such as serving as technical advisors and/or donating the vehicles to be used in filming.

=== History ===
Although car chases on film were staged as early as the motor vehicle itself — one of the earliest examples being Runaway Match directed by Alf Collins in 1903 — the consensus among historians and film critics is that the first modern car chase movie was 1968's Bullitt. The 10-minute-long chase scene in Bullitt was far longer and far faster than what had gone before, and placed cameras to give perspectives from inside the cars, which had been made possible by camera miniaturisation. Previously, car chase scenes were often staged using the rear projection effect.

=== Computer-generated imagery ===
The use of computer-generated imagery for car chases has become popular since the 2000s and, although costly, eliminates any danger to the actors and removes the necessity of damaging or destroying functional vehicles, particularly those that are rare, expensive, valuable, or not allowed to be damaged in production (such as if the car is product placement).

However, some critics claim that CGI eliminates the realism of chase scenes or, when done poorly or too obviously, can be visually jarring and uncanny. Such criticism has affected recent Hollywood productions; Driven, for example, was panned for its heavy use of CGI in chase scenes. As such, some films like Ronin, The Bourne Supremacy, The Kingdom, The Dark Knight, and Need For Speed, used live-action chases with minimal use of CGI, if at all. Furious 7 used CGI for "only 10%" of its action sequences, mostly to erase production artifacts such as wires or add backgrounds, as stunt coordinator Spiro Razatos wanted to rely more on real stunts rather than CGI because he wanted the whole sequence to "feel real" and fulfill audience's expectations.

=== Notable examples ===
- The Fast & Furious franchise of films and television series features numerous car chases between various parties, including but not limited to police and criminal organizations.
- Gone in 60 Seconds (1974) features a 40-minute car chase scene with multiple crashes (some of them unplanned, real accidents) and a 30-foot-high, 128-feet-long airborne jump over crashed cars that block a road.
- Films such as The Blues Brothers, Smokey and the Bandit, The Sugarland Express, Thelma & Louise, Beverly Hills Cop, Blue Streak, Lethal Weapon, The Keystone Cops, W. C. Fields's comedies, The Three Stooges, It's a Mad, Mad, Mad, Mad World, The Shaggy Dog, The Gumball Rally, No Deposit, No Return, Freaky Friday, The Gnome Mobile, The Million Dollar Duck, What's Up, Doc?, and Short Time feature car chases that are used for comedic purposes.
- To Live and Die in L.A. and Ronin include scenes of cars going the wrong way at high speed against moderately congested freeway traffic.
- The Matrix Reloaded depicts a car chase with characters moving from one vehicle to another and fighting atop moving vehicles.
- A number of television series have been built around the popularity of car chases, such as CHiPs, Adam-12, The Dukes of Hazzard, Knight Rider, Airwolf, and Chase. Some reality television series, especially those following law enforcement, have also depicted car chases over the course of following police activities, such as Cops, World's Wildest Police Videos, and Live PD.

== In video games ==
Many video games, often within the open world and racing genres, tend to contain, if not focus on, car chases of some sort, usually involving police. Many of these chases are often heavily stylized, with police often ramming or even shooting suspect vehicles, or deploying dedicated "pursuit units" in performance cars.

=== Notable examples ===
- Early examples included Bally Midway's Spy Hunter (1983), featuring a James Bond-style weaponized vehicle; and Atari Games' APB (1987), where the player controlled a police car.
- Chase H.Q. (1988) and its sequels have the player assume the role of a police officer who must stop fleeing criminals in high-speed pursuits.
- The Need for Speed series is notable for its depiction of police pursuits, usually involving high-performance cars driven by both criminals and police.
- The Grand Theft Auto series is especially famous for its depiction of car chases in both missions and its open world, with reckless pursuits by both criminals and police being possible in every game in the series.
- L.A. Noire (2011) features police pursuits in several of its cases and missions, though unlike Grand Theft Auto, the player takes the role of the police.

== See also ==
- Commandeering
- Traffic stop
- Carjacking
- Motor vehicle theft
- Street racing
- Road rage
- Skye's Law
