= StarChase =

US company selling GPS tracking technology

StarChase. LLC
- Industry: Vehicle tracking system
- Founded: 1 January 2001
- Headquarters: Virginia Beach, United States
- Area served: United States
- Website: starchase.com

StarChase is a company that produces GPS tracking devices of the same name, for law enforcement purposes. Developed from early 2006, the less-than-lethal vehicle tagging system tags, tracks, and locates a fleeing vehicle.

The system was developed to reduce the need for an inherent danger of high speed pursuits. The US National Institute of Justice at one time was looking at technologies to reduce personnel and property damage, including tire deflation devices, electronics interference (through electronic discharge immobilising devices, electromagnetic radiation devices, and directed energy devices), and remote tracking.

StarChase components consist of an electronic tag in the form of a small, cylindrical projectile with one end covered in a viscous, industrial strength adhesive, which contains a battery-operated GPS tracker and quad-band transmitter (powered by a 1300 mAh dry cell). The projectile is fired by compressed air from a small launcher on the front grille of a police car. The deploying vehicle must be within 25 feet (7.6 m) range of the offending vehicle. The tracking signal location is then monitored from a dispatcher's computer screen. In 2013, the vehicle-mounted solution was US$5000 per installation, and $500 for each bullet. By 2023, the device was US$5900.

The StarChase system, as of mid-2013 was in use by the Arizona Department of Public Safety, Los Angeles Sheriff's Department, Austin Police Department, and other agencies globally including the Ontario Provincial Police.

By early 2023, the company released a variation using a rifle platform called the 'Guardian-HX'. Based on the AR-15 rifle, pressurised gas propels the tracking projectile, and the rifle magazine well holds the battery. The projectile travels at 37 miles per hour (60 km/h), and has to be discharged by the rifle user within 35 feet (11 m) of the offending vehicle.

== See also ==
- Real-time locating
- Real-time location services
- Automatic vehicle location
