= Mamihlapinatapai =

Word in the Yaghan language

The word mamihlapinatapai is derived from the Yaghan language of Tierra del Fuego, listed in The Guinness Book of World Records as the "most succinct word", and is considered one of the hardest words to translate. It has been translated as "a look that without words is shared by two people who want to initiate something, but that neither will start" or "looking at each other hoping that the other will offer to do something which both parties desire but are unwilling to do".

A romantic interpretation of the meaning has also been given, as "that look across the table when two people are sharing an unspoken but private moment. When each knows the other understands and is in agreement with what is being expressed. An expressive and meaningful silence."

A literal translation could be "to make each other feel awkward".

== Morphology ==
The word consists of the reflexive/passive prefix ma- (mam- before a vowel), the root ihlapi (pronounced [iɬapi]), which means "to be at a loss as what to do next", the stative suffix -n, an achievement suffix -ata, and the dual suffix -apai, which in composition with the reflexive mam- has a reciprocal sense.

== Usage ==
The term is cited in books and articles on game theory associated with the volunteer's dilemma.

It is also referenced in Defining the World in a discussion of the difficulties facing Samuel Johnson in trying to arrive at succinct, yet accurate, definitions of words.

South Korean girl group Illit announced their fourth EP, whose title is derived from the Yaghan word, at the end of their Press Start tour in Seoul, South Korea on March 16, 2026. The EP was released on April 30, 2026.

== See also ==
- Ithkuil
