= Fireman's rule =

Restriction on lawsuits by public safety officials

The fireman's rule (firefighter's rule) is a common law or statutory restriction on tort actions by public safety officials. In general, the fireman's rule bars lawsuits by firefighters, police officers and, in some jurisdictions, all government safety professionals from collecting on damages that occur in the course of their duties even in cases of clear negligence by other parties.

== Rationale and use ==
The principal reason for the firefighter's rule is the assumption of the risk that public safety officers willingly accept as the risks inherent to their professional duties. Said another way, since the very purpose of public safety professionals such as firefighters and police officers is to confront danger, the public is not liable for injuries incurred while carrying out that function.

Although the rule is named after the risks and actions by firefighters, the relationship between danger and duties is similar in all public safety officers, and other professional rescuers. Many jurisdictions have extended this rule to include other public safety professionals.

The determinative factor when applying the firefighter's rule is whether the injury sustained by the firefighter or police officer is related to the particular dangers which they are expected to face as part of their job duties. In situations where public safety professionals are injured while responding to an emergency, the firefighter's rule precludes the public safety professionals from suing individuals whose negligence caused or contributed to the emergency that caused the injury.

== Criticism ==
The fireman's rule has been heavily criticized for preventing police officers from suing criminals who intentionally lead them on high-speed car chases. In response to one such case, the California State Legislature enacted California Civil Code Section 1714.9 in 1982, which overrides the fireman's rule where the tortious conduct occurred after the defendant knew or should have known of the plaintiff's presence.

== Exceptions ==
In certain states the courts have not always applied the fireman's rule. In 1995, the Pennsylvania Superior Court ruled that in regards to landowners, firefighters are viewed as "licensees", and are therefore owed the same duty of care that any citizen who is permitted to be on the property would receive. In earlier decisions, such as 1988's Mull v. Kerstetter, in which a volunteer firefighter was injured after falling into an unmarked and unprotected window well, the court ruled that a police officer entering land in his or her official capacity and in response to a call for assistance is generally considered a licensee. Therefore, the landowner is responsible for warning the licensee of any dangerous hidden conditions on the premises.

Oregon abolished the Fireman's Rule through judicial precedent in the early to mid-1980s, while New Jersey abolished the doctrine by legislative statute. In Minnesota, peace officers and public safety officers are exempted from the fireman's rule by statute.

== See also ==
- Baseball Rule, similar tort exception for foul-ball injuries to spectators at baseball games, which holds that a baseball team or its sponsors cannot be held liable for such injuries as long as sufficient protection measures have been implemented
- Rescue doctrine
