= Skye's Law =

Amendment to the law of police pursuit in New South Wales

Crimes Amendment (Police Pursuits) Act 2010

Parliament of New South Wales
- Long title: An Act to amend the Crimes Act 1900 in relation to police pursuits; and to amend the Criminal Procedure Act 1986 and the Road Transport (General) Act 2005 consequentially
- Citation: 2010 No. 2
- Enacted by: Parliament of New South Wales
- Royal assent: 18 March 2010

Related legislation
- Crimes Act 1900; Criminal Procedure Act 1986; Road Transport (General) Act 2005

Skye's Law is an informal name for the Crimes Amendment (Police Pursuits) Act 2010 of New South Wales, Australia. It is named after the 19-month old toddler Skye Sassine, who was killed on 31 December 2009 when her family's car was hit by a driver suspected of armed robbery who was trying to evade police. The driver in that case was convicted of her manslaughter, but Skye's Law makes evading a police pursuit a specific offence in itself, with prison terms of up to three years, or up to five years for repeat offences. There was also criticism of the role of police in pursuit. Deputy coroner, Magistrate Paul MacMahon, said, "The evidence shows that Senior Constable [Troy] Skinner in firstly undertaking urgent duty and subsequently engaging in the pursuit on 31 December 2009, did so in utter disregard for the requirements imposed on him by the [safe driving policy]".

The offence is committed if the driver is aware of the pursuit, fails to stop and then drives recklessly or dangerously. The law takes the form of a new section 51B inserted into the Crimes Act 1900 by the 2010 Act.

The law was first used within a few weeks of being passed. Between May 2010 and March 2012, 445 people were convicted under Skye's Law, 180 of whom were imprisoned.

In 2012, Western Australia also introduced a range of offences relating to police pursuit attracting sentences of imprisonment, in the Road Traffic (Miscellaneous Amendments) Act 2012.
