= RoadPeace =

National charity in the UK

- Founded: 1992
- Dissolved: 2026
- Region served: United Kingdom
- Website: RoadPeace

RoadPeace was the national charity for road crash victims in the UK. It closed on 9 January 2026.

== Overview ==
It supported the people affected by road crashes with emotional and practical support and advocacy. It operated a help line and provides practical support to people affected. RoadPeace founded the World Day of Remembrance for Road Traffic Victims and established the RoadPeace Wood within the National Memorial Arboretum.

The organisation also sought to change attitudes so that road deaths and injuries are no longer "treated by the economy as acceptable, by the judicial system as trivial and by society as accidents"; that road crash victims are no longer treated as "third class victims, but as people who have undergone a terrible trauma and who therefore need justice, respect for their rights, care, support and acknowledgement of their loss and suffering". They also worked to reduce 'road danger' to that of other everyday activities and to improve services and criminal and civil justice in order to greatly reduced number of road crash victims.

== History ==
RoadPeace was founded by Brigitte Chaudhry MBE following the death of her son in 1990, after which she was shocked at the 'shabby' treatment of his innocent death when is discovered that the response to a road death was very different from the response to any other form of violent death from any other cause. Chaudhry decided to challenge the casual attitude to road casualties and offer support to the victims.

The first Roadpeace meeting was held in 1991, the organisation was established in 1992 with the first ever helpline for road crash victims with Chaudhry was National Secretary; the organisation was publicly launched in April 1993.

RoadPeace organised the first World Day of Remembrance for Road Traffic Victims in 1993 which now takes place in many places on every continent on the third Sunday in November every year (a week after Remembrance Sunday which takes place each year in the United Kingdom and which remembers the dead from wars). with the European Federation of Road Traffic Victims, which was also founded by Chaudhry.

The first trees were planted in the RoadPeace Wood is within National Memorial Arboretum in 2001 and the wood was dedicated in 2002. An annual ceremony of remembrance for road traffic victims is now held on the second Saturday in August every year.

In 2005, the World Day of Remembrance was adopted by the United Nations General Assembly

Brigitte stepping down from day to day involvement in April 2008 to concentrate on international work. She is currently president of RoadPeace.

The organisation won a Guardian Charity Award in 2008.

The charity closed down on 9 January 2026 and its staff were made redundant.

== See also ==
- Living Streets (UK) – UK charity for everyday walking
- Slower Speeds Initiative
- Cynthia Barlow
