= Runaway Match =

- Directed by: Alf Collins
- Distributed by: Gaumont
- Release date: 12 December 1903 (United States)
- Running time: 5 minutes
- Country: United Kingdom
- Language: Silent

Runaway Match or The Runaway Match, or Marriage by Motor (UK title Elopement à la Mode) is a 1903 short silent film consisting of nine shots. It may be the "first auto-centered narrative film" and the first car chase in the movies.

== Plot ==
A couple elope by car. The woman's wealthy father gives chase, but his limousine breaks down. When he arrives too late to prevent the marriage, he becomes reconciled to his new son-in-law.
