= European Federation of Road Traffic Victims =

Non-governmental organisation

The European Federation of Road Traffic Victims (FEVR) is a non-governmental organisation that provides emotional, social and juridical assistance to road traffic victims or/and their relatives and supports organisations in many countries to achieve this aim. Together with the World Health Organization and RoadPeace, it organises the World Day of Remembrance for Road Traffic Victims which takes place globally on the third Saturday in November each year. Their founder & 1st president was Marcel Haegi, the 2nd president (2004-2010) was Brigitte Chaudhry MBE, who founded RoadPeace in 1991. The actual president is Jeannot Mersch, all 3 bereaved parents.
