= German Statutory Accident Insurance =

Social insurance in Germany

German Statutory Accident Insurance or workers' compensation is among the oldest branches of German social insurance. Occupational accident insurance was established in Germany by statute in 1884. It is now a national, compulsory program that insures workers for injuries or illness incurred through their employment, or the commute to or from their employment. Wage earners, apprentices, family helpers and students including children in kindergarten are covered by this program. Almost all self-employed persons can voluntarily become insured. The German workers' compensation laws were the first of their kind.

== History ==
In 1871, the German Empire was founded at the end of the Franco-Prussian War. Formerly Chancellor of Prussia, Otto von Bismarck, now Chancellor of the new German Empire, introduced highly-progressive welfare legislation by the standards of Europe at the time.

The Sickness Bill became law in 1883 and the Accident Bill in 1884. Otto von Bismarck, Chancellor of the German Empire, introduced the programs to assist workers in the event of accidental injury, illness or old age. The initial system was financed by workers and employers. The Sickness Insurance law paid indemnity for up to 13 weeks. The first 4 weeks were at 50% of prior wages, from the fifth week on the benefit was 66.7% of previous earnings. Workers who were completely disabled received benefits at 67% after the 13 week, financed entirely by employers. If the disabled person required constant care, up to 100% of previous wages were awarded.

The agencies in charge of providing the form of insurance are the industrial and agricultural employers' liability funds as well as public sector accident insurance funds, which include both municipal accident insurance association and other accident funds. While employers'liability funds are organized according to industry, the public sector accident insurance funds are the most part organized regionally.

The accident insurance funds govern themselves (self-administration) with equal representation divided between employers, entrepreneurs and employees. The organs of self-administration are the member’s assembly and executive board. That arrangement ensures that the interests of all participants are represented.

The legal basis for occupational accident insurance is formed by the German Social Code, in particular Book VII (SGB VII).

The German compensation system was used as a model for many other nations' workers' compensation programs.

== Modern compensation system in Germany ==
Today, in Germany, every worker is a member of a related Workers Compensation Institute (Berufsgenossenschaft), and almost all self-employed persons may voluntarily become insured members of an institute as well. The institutes have an approximately 90% return-to-work rate, using vocational retraining and upgraded vocational qualifications as key strategies.

All accidents in the workplace or in the commute to and from it are covered. Also, 80 diseases are considered occupational diseases and are also covered by the program.

The workers' compensation program is funded by employers (except for the government's coverage for students and children and a government subsidy to the Agricultural Accident Fund). The average employer contribution was in 2019 at 1.14% of payroll.

Injured workers have a right to appeal to the committee of their Institute. The next level of appeal after the committee is to a Sozialgericht court. The appeal to the German Social Courts (Sozialgerichte) is free of cost for the worker.

== Financing ==
Statutory occupational accident insurance is among the oldest branches of German social insurance. Unlike health, long-term care, pension and unemployment insurance, statutory occupational accident insurance is contribution-free for those insured. The costs for comprehensive insurance coverage for prevention and rehabilitation are borne by employers. For public sector jobs, the federal, state and municipal governments carry the costs.

The contribution rates are determinates according to the pay-as-you-go principle, based on expenditures in prior years. This means that at the end of each fiscal year the statutory accident insurance funds allocate their expenditures among the member companies. The calculation basis is thus formed by actual financing needs: the allocation amount to be put aside, the wages and salaries of the insured and the hazard class of the particular industry concerned. For the municipal accident insurance associations and accidents funds, the contributions are based on the population, the number of insured persons, or wages and salaries.

== Who is insured ==
Every year, around 1 million accidents occur in the Federal Republic of Germany involving employees who are either working or on their way to or from work. These are joined by around 18,000 cases of recognized occupational illnesses and some 1.2 million school accidents. For those affected, the consequences often entail wide-ranging changes in their way of life. Restoring these people’s health and, as far as possible, their ability to work is the task of statutory accident insurance.

Every employee and trainee is covered by statutory occupational accident insurance. In industry and agriculture the employer’s liability insurance fund (Berufsgenossenschaften) is responsible for accident insurance. Providing coverage in the public sector are the municipal accident insurance associations (Gemeindeunfallversicherungsverbände) and other public-sector accident funds.

Coverage is provided for accidents at work or school or on the way to or from work or school, as well as for occupational illnesses.

== Benefits ==
Statutory occupational accident insurance has the task of undertaking measures to prevent job-related accidents and illnesses, as well as to protect workers from on-the-job hazards. If occupational accidents or illnesses occur, accident insurance provides assistance toward restoring the health and working ability of the persons involved and compensation to the insured persons or their persons or their survivors through the provision of cash benefits.

The primary mission of statutory occupational accident insurance according to the legislation is the use all means at its disposal to prevent occupational accidents and illness from occurring in the first place and to minimize potential job-related hazards. The focus is placed on advising companies in all matters having to do with industrial safety and health. That includes providing employers and employees with comprehensive instructions and guideline, as well as international media. Accident insurance agencies also hold free informational, motivational events on the subject of safety at work.

If an insured person has an accident at work or suffers from an occupational illness, statutory occupational accident insurance covers the resulting costs. That means that the insurance fund provides the best possible medical, occupational and social rehabilitation, as well as financial compensation if applicable.

In the event of an occupational accident or illness, statutory occupational accident insurance provides:

- payment for full medical treatment
- occupational integration assistance (for example, retraining)
- social integration assistance and supplementary assistance
- cash benefits to the insured and their surviving dependents.

The top priority of the accident insurance fund is to restore the health and ability to work of the insured person. Pensions are paid to fund members only if it is not possible to fully restore their ability to work: for those whose earning capacity is reduced by at least 20 percent.

Disability benefits are paid as a weekly "wage loss” compensation. Workers unable to perform their current job due to injury or illness receive periodic payments of 80% of their prior gross earnings until they return to work (up to a maximum total payment). If rehabilitation is prognosticated to be impossible, the worker receives the benefit for 78 weeks.

Wages are paid for six weeks by the employer before the employee goes onto short-term disability benefits.

Workers who have a loss of earning capacity for work injury or occupational disease of 20% or more receive a pension equal to 66.7% of their previous year's earnings up to the specified maximum. That is paid until the age of 65 unless they begin to receive an old-age pension earlier than that age.

Medical care benefits are comprehensive, with the total cost of physical rehabilitation and appliances being covered. Institutes provide all medical care benefits and control the choice of doctor and hospital.
