= Good Samaritan Law (India) =

Indian legislation

- Emblem of the Supreme Court of India

Supreme Court of India
- Long title: A law to give protection for those who help an accident victim from legal interventions.
- Territorial extent: Whole of States and Union Territories of India
- Enacted by: Supreme Court of India
- Enacted: 30 March 2016

Amended by
- Motor Vehicles Act 2019
- Status: In force

India's Good Samaritan Law was passed as a Bill by the Supreme court of India on March 30, 2016, and gave the "Force of Law" to the guidelines for the protection of Good Samaritans and then issued by the Ministry of Road Transport and Highways. In the consecutive months, the state governments have passed GO (Government Order). Later, it was included in the draft of Motor Vehicles Act 2019. Also issued were operating procedures for Good Samaritans. Important points stated are

- Police should not involve the Good Samaritans for investigation.
- Hospitals should not refuse to treat the accident victims and should not charge for First Aid.
- Good Samaritans should be protected from civil and criminal liability.
- Good Samaritans need not reveal their identity.
- Good Samaritans can choose to be an eyewitness, and should not be compelled otherwise.

== Background ==
India is the second largest country in the world after China to lose more number of lives in road accidents. As per the Ministry of Road Transport and Highways statistics. 1317 crashes and 413 deaths everyday or 55 crashes and 17 deaths every hour happen due to road crashes in India. More than 50% accident victims die because they don't receive medical attention during the Golden Hour. In reality, bystanders don't often come to help the accident victims, fearing legal intervention. Good Samaritan laws exist in many countries to provide legal protection to bystanders who assist accident victims.

== Awareness and impact ==
=== First Good Samaritan Law Day ===
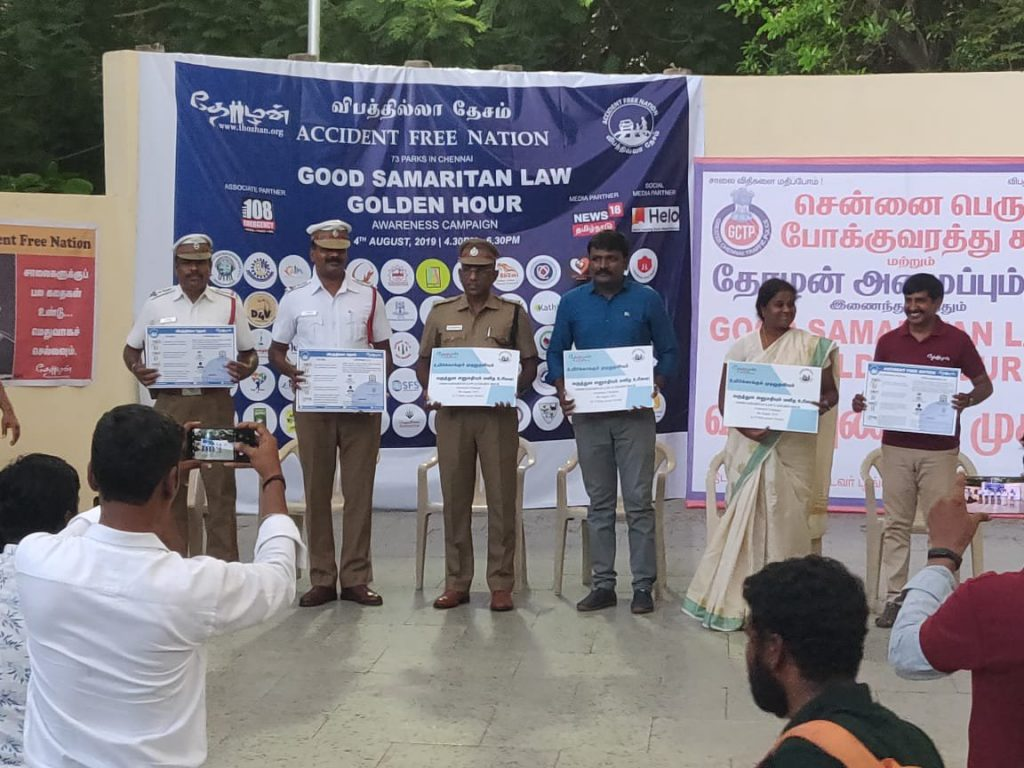
Chief guests displaying the awareness pamphlets(from right) Mr. Radhakrishnan, Convener, Thozhan Trust, Dr. Jayanthi, Metropolitan Magistrate, Mr. Surendranath, ACP and police officers.

To educate the public on issues of concern either nationally or globally, a day is required where a multitude of individuals from all walks of life get involved, in a way or another and hence for the same reason, 30 March 2020 was first celebrated as Good Samaritan Law Day in India by Thozhan, an NGO based in Chennai. Thozhan have been working on various activities like environmental conservation, coastal cleanups, leadership development, community empowerment, etc. from 2007 across Tamil Nadu. Of these activities, road safety was being concentrated extensively from 2013 in the aim of transforming our country as an "Accident Free Nation" where they conduct "Traffic Awareness Campaigns" in public places such as live traffic signals, parks, beaches, etc. every week where their volunteers holding awareness placards & banners interact and remind commuters about the importance of following traffic rules and safety gears. And special campaigns happen during Road Safety Week and other national days of importance by doing cosplay to promote road safety in public places. Few of the major activities done by them for educating the importance of road safety are conducting Traffic Awareness Campaign in 100 signals at same day and same time by involving thousands of youngsters from various volunteering organizations, student groups and public in 2014, 2015, 2016 and foot board awareness for public commuters across Chennai in 67 bus stops which is a step to prevent accidents from happening. In the year 2017, 2018, 2019, mega awareness drive was carried out in public parks to create awareness about Good Samaritan Law and Golden Hour first aid training in more than 75 public parks respectively at the same day and same time by the volunteers certified by GVK EMRI. During the First Good Samaritan Law Day, they educated and created awareness about this law through online campaign where more than 500 volunteers and public pledged to be a Good Samaritans and also taught their family members about the Good Samaritan Law. They organized virtual pledging through google sheets, video & audio forms in order to reach out the public during the COVID-19 lock down. This was followed by giving representation to the State and Central Government authorities to announce this day officially.

=== India's First Online Mega Awareness Campaign ===
In August 2020, Thozhan has organized a mega online awareness campaign across India where many NGOs, college students, school students and public have participated on it. Trainers from their team have taken sessions on Good Samaritan Law and Golden Hour via zoom to more than 2750+ participants on a span of 2 days. The first day, 8 August 2020 the session was held continuously from 10 AM to 9 PM and on 9 August 2020 also session were held continuously for 12 hours where the participants attended are from Jammu and Kashmir, Punjab, Delhi, Gujarat, Andhra Pradesh, Bangalore, Kerala and Tamil Nadu and took pledge to help accident victims which makes this as a 1st mega national level awareness campaign happened so far in our country for road safety. Demands were put, letters were written and sent to the Prime Minister of India, Ministry of Road Transport & highways, President of India and Vice President of India to implement "Good Samaritan Law" as a full-fledged law in the upcoming parliamentary session.
