= Civil courage =

Civil courage is a type of courage, related closely to heroism, with which a person acts bravely to intervene or take a stand in a social situation. It is courage shown by a person by representing human values (e.g., human dignity, justice, helping people in need) in public (e.g., towards authorities, superiors, strangers, or perpetrators, regardless of possible personal social and physical consequences).

== Overview ==
Italian journalist and writer Franca Magnani (1925–1996) wrote, "Je mehr Bürger mit Zivilcourage ein Land hat, desto weniger Helden wird es einmal brauchen" ("The more citizens with civil courage a country has, the fewer heroes it needs").

== Contemporary use ==
Civil courage was referred to by psychologist Tobias Greitemeyer as constituting acts of bravery, carried out with the objective of enforcing a societal or ethical standard, without concern for the effect these acts might have on one's own social position. Civil courage is often punished and the courageous person risks ostracism. In this way, it is distinguished from those altruistic behaviors and other forms of courage that meet with social approval.

In the case of altruistic, helping behavior, an individual might expect to be praised or receive positive social consequences from having helped, despite possible financial or material loss. In actions where civil courage is demonstrated, the person carrying out the action may experience negative social consequences such as alienation, verbal abuse, or violence. Civil courage is displayed when a person, in spite of the perceived threat of such negative consequences, acts to intervene in a social context. This is demonstrated in the case of whistleblowers, who do not necessarily risk their lives but whose action could lead to prison time.

There are those who associate civil courage with non-violence as developed by Mahatma Gandhi and Martin Luther King Jr. and who cite such association as the cause why it faded as a model of conduct—due to the perception that it is uninteresting and boring when compared to violent revolution as a way of making social change.

Alexander Solzhenitsyn said of civil courage that “we have gotten used to regarding as valor only valor in war (or the kind that’s needed for flying in outer space), the kind which jingle-jangles with medals. We have forgotten another concept of valor—civil valor. And that’s all our society needs, just that, just that, just that!”

== Learning civil courage ==
A study from 2021 showed that German citizens consider the following contexts relevant to learn civil courage: “at home and/or from family”, “through volunteering”, “in sports organizations”, “in extracurricular activities”, “in school”, “in professional organizations”, “from friends”, and “in youth movements”. The following contexts are not considered relevant: “from television”, “from social media”, and “from the internet”.

== See also ==
- Dietrich Bonhoeffer – German Lutheran pastor and theologian (1906–1945)
- Good Germans – Term for being passive in the face of atrocity
