= Death of Cristina and Violetta Djeordsevic =

Accidental public drowning incident noted for bystander apathy

Cristina Djeordsevic
- Born: 1995; Naples, Italy
- Died: July 19, 2008 (aged 12–13); Naples, Italy
- Cause of death: Drowning
- Known for: Cause célèbre

Violetta Djeordsevic
- Born: 1997; Naples, Italy
- Died: July 19, 2008 (aged 10–11); Naples, Italy
- Cause of death: Drowning
- Known for: Cause célèbre

Cristina and Violetta Djeordsevic (Note: Other sources spell the surname "Djeordsevic" as "Djordjevic" or "Georgevic".) (or Ebrehmovich (Note: Other sources spell the surname "Ebrehmovich" as "Ebrehemovich" or "Ibramovitc".)) were Italian Roma sisters aged 13 and 11 (Note: Other sources give their respective ages as 16 and 14, "teenage", 12 and 11, or 13 and 12.) who drowned in the sea at the public beach at Torregaveta in the Metropolitan City of Naples on 19 July 2008. News media circulated photographs of other beach users apparently continuing with their leisure activities indifferent to the nearby bodies of the girls partially covered by beach towels. Commentators interpreted this as symbolising widespread anti-Roma sentiment in Italy.

== Deaths ==
Cristina and Violetta were born and raised in the "Campo Autorizzato" (authorised camp) at Scampia or Secondigliano in Naples to Branko and Miriana (Note: Other sources spell the name "Miriana" as "Myriana".) Djeordsevic, originally from former Yugoslavia and of Eastern Orthodox faith. (Note: The Observer says Miriana migrated to Italy as a teenager from the border area between Serbia and Bosnia and Herzegovina; Corriere CE quotes her saying she was born in Italy of Croatian heritage. Branko's father Milan was from Macedonia) On the day of their deaths, Cristina and Violetta with their sister Diana (aged 9) and cousin Manuela (aged 16) took the Cumana railway from the camp to its terminus at Torregaveta, beside a popular public beach next to private beaches. The beach is divided between the suburban comuni of Bacoli and Monte di Procida. The girls were hawking trinkets to holidaymakers and also, according to some reports, begging.

The four girls decided to enter the sea, despite rough waves and not knowing how to swim. The sea at the beach has dangerous currents and there had been at least 10 drownings in the previous 15 years. There was no lifeguard or warning notices; the area is poor and public funds were scarce. One eyewitness said nobody else was in the water at the time. Cristina and Violetta were further out and were swept underwater against rocks. Manuela and Diana called for help, and lifeguards from nearby private beaches arrived. The coastguard arrived within 10 minutes but the girls had drowned, so they notified the municipal morgue and left. The police took away the surviving girls to contact their parents. A beach towel covered each corpse except for the feet.

A "crowd of curious onlookers that had formed around the bodies quickly dispersed". The bodies remained on the beach until the morgue personnel arrived, after an interval variously reported as one or three hours. During this time, "beach life resumed" with people sunbathing, picnicking, or playing. Eventually the bodies were placed in coffins and carried away.

== Response ==
Photographs were published on the front pages of La Repubblica and Corriere della Sera, as well as online and in foreign media. One showed the girls' corpses with a couple having a picnic in the background; another a coffin being carried past people in sunloungers. Italians described as having condemned the scene included the "liberal elite", newspapers, and civil liberties groups, as well as Cardinal Crescenzio Sepe, the Archbishop of Naples, who posted on his blog that it represented the "coarsening of human sentiment". Laura Boldrini, Italy's UNHCR representative, expressed "worry at the circumstances of how the tragedy unfolded".

Commentators linked the incident to a recent upsurge in anti-Roma populist discourse, including confrontations in working-class neighbourhoods and sensationalist media coverage of alleged Roma criminality. In May rumours that a Roma woman had abducted a baby led to violence and arson in two Roma camps in Naples. Roberto Maroni, the Minister of the Interior in the Berlusconi-led government, had announced a scheme to register all Roma by photograph or fingerprint. An ongoing garbage collection strike was also souring the public mood in Naples. Agence France-Presse said Italians had made "little reaction to the outcry", and that Cardinal Sepe was "alone among leading figures to condemn the sunbathers' apparent indifference".

Francesco Iannuzzi, mayor of Monte di Procida, blamed the incident on the delay in the morgue staff arriving at the scene; he denied the charge of indifference on the basis that many had tried to save the girls; he doubted whether the crowd could have known the girls' ethnicity. Sergio Romano, while acknowledging the crowd's indifference, like Iannuzzi questioned the racist dimension, pointing out a similar instance of a non-Roma body on a beach in northern Italy in 1997. Of those whose photographs had been published, one asked of the beachgoers, "what were they supposed to do?"; one told France 24 that concerned bystanders had kept vigil by the bodies, and his photograph showed "a rare moment when they moved away". An article in Nanni Magazine suggested that foreshortening in the published photographs made the beachgoers appear closer to the bodies than was the case. Some locals said that those who remained on the beach were "Ukrainians or Poles".

The girls were given an Eastern Orthodox funeral service in the Roma camp in Naples, attended by 300 Roma and city and regional representatives. It was followed by a 10-day wake. They were buried in Qualiano cemetery. The local Catholic parish and the Community of Sant'Egidio organised a memorial mass at nearby Ercolano on 23 July "to send a message of love and solidarity". A meeting of Naples comune council agreed unanimously to name a street after the girls. Sant'Egidio held anniversary prayer services in later years.

Roberto Malini of human rights body EveryOne Group cast doubt on the official version of events, suggesting a cover up for homicide. The girls' mother denied this and insisted that they had drowned. In October 2009, the girls' next of kin brought a lawsuit against Bacoli and Monte di Procida municipalities for failure to provide the required marine safety measures at the beach.

SEPSA — Spettatori all'esequie di passeggeri senz'anima, a 2009 play by Mimmo Borrelli, is based on two events: the Torregaveta drownings and the death, also in Naples, of Petru Bîrlădeanu, a Romanian street musician killed by crossfire in a Camorra shootout.

== See also ==
- Bystander effect
