= Rescue doctrine =

In the United States, the rescue doctrine of the law of torts holds that if a tortfeasor creates a circumstance that places the tort victim in danger, the tortfeasor is liable not only for the harm caused to the victim, but also the harm caused to any person injured in an effort to rescue that victim. This doctrine was originally promulgated by Benjamin N. Cardozo in the 1921 case, Wagner v. Int'l Ry. Co. There, writing for the Court of Appeals of New York (which is the supreme court of that state), Cardozo stated: "Danger invites rescue. The cry of distress is the summons to relief [...] The emergency begets the man. The wrongdoer may not have foreseen the coming of a deliverer. He is accountable as if he had." The rescue doctrine was established nineteen years later, in the landmark case of Cote v. Palmer.

Essentially, the rescue doctrine means that the rescuer can recover damages from a defendant when the rescuer is injured rescuing someone. The defendant is usually negligent in causing the accident to occur. Other cases have occurred where the plaintiff is injured rescuing the defendant and is able to collect damages.

In Wagner v. International Railway, riders on the defendant's trains were allowed to walk between cars while the train was moving. In one incident, a rider fell through the cars. The plaintiff, trying to help the fallen rider, was injured himself. The court found the defendant liable because of negligence to allow riders to walk between cars while the train was moving. The aforementioned example is a reference to the concept that Danger invites Rescue. Whoever caused the accident will be liable for any subsequent accident which develops as a result of the original accident.

Essentially, in its pure form the Rescue Doctrine boils down to 4 main elements - all of which must be met in order to bring it to bear for the person asserting its privilege.

1. There must be peril or the appearance of peril to a third party, caused by the defendant.
2. That peril or appearance of peril must be imminent
3. A reasonable person would recognize the peril or appearance of peril and the plaintiff must also have actually recognized it.
4. The plaintiff must have exercised reasonable care in effecting the rescue.

== See also ==
- Fireman's rule
