= Bystander effect =

Social psychological theory

The bystander effect (also called bystander apathy or the Genovese effect) is a social psychological theory that states that individuals are less likely to offer help to a victim in the presence of other people.

The theory was first proposed in 1964 after the murder of Kitty Genovese, in which a newspaper had reported (erroneously) that 37 bystanders saw or heard the attack without coming to her assistance or calling the police. Much research, mostly in psychology research laboratories, has focused on increasingly varied factors, such as the number of bystanders, ambiguity, group cohesiveness, and diffusion of responsibility that reinforces mutual denial. If a single individual is asked to complete a task alone, the sense of responsibility will be strong, and there will be a positive response; however, if a group is required to complete a task together, each individual in the group will have a weak sense of responsibility and will often shrink back in the face of difficulties or responsibilities.

Recent research has focused on "real-world" events captured on security cameras, and the coherence and robustness of the effect have come under question. More recent studies also show that this effect can generalize to workplace settings, where subordinates often refrain from informing managers regarding ideas, concerns, and opinions.

== Social psychology research ==
The bystander effect was first demonstrated and popularized in the laboratory by social psychologists John M. Darley and Bibb Latané in 1968 after they became interested in the topic following the murder of Kitty Genovese in 1964. These researchers launched a series of experiments that resulted in one of the strongest and most replicable effects in social psychology. In a typical experiment, the participant is either alone or among a group of other participants or confederates. An emergency situation is staged and researchers measure how long it takes the participants to intervene, if they intervene. These experiments have found that the presence of others inhibits helping, often by a large margin. For example, Bibb Latané and Judith Rodin (1969) staged an experiment around a woman in distress, where subjects were either alone, with a friend, or with a stranger. Seventy percent of the people alone called out or went to help the woman after they believed she had fallen and was hurt, but when paired with a stranger only 40 percent offered help.

A 2011 meta-analysis found that the bystander effect was most likely to occur in non-dangerous emergencies but did not occur in dangerous emergencies. The bystander effect was less likely to occur with highly competent bystanders. In dangerous emergencies, the presence of male bystanders also reduced the bystander effect; this is not the case for male bystanders in non-emergency situations.

Philpot et al. (2019) examined over 200 sets of real-life surveillance video recordings from the United Kingdom, the Netherlands, and South Africa to answer "the most pressing question for actual public victims": whether help would be forthcoming at all. They found that intervention was the norm, and in over 90% of conflicts one or more bystanders intervened to provide help. Increased bystander presence increased the likelihood that someone would intervene.

=== Variables affecting bystanders ===
==== Emergency versus non-emergency situations ====
Latané and Darley performed three experiments to test bystander behavior in non-emergency situations. Their results indicated that the way in which the subjects were asked for help mattered. In one condition, subjects asked a bystander for his or her name. More people provided an answer when the students gave their name first. In another condition, the students asked bystanders for a dime. When the student gave an explanation, such as saying that their wallet had been stolen, the percentage of people giving assistance was higher (72%) than when the student just asked for a dime (34%). Additional research by Faul, Mark, et al., using data collected by EMS officials when responding to an emergency, indicated that the response of bystanders was correlated with the health severity of the situation.

According to Latané and Darley, there are five characteristics of emergencies that affect bystanders:

1. Emergencies involve threat of harm or actual harm
2. Emergencies are unusual and rare
3. The type of action required in an emergency differs from situation to situation
4. Emergencies cannot be predicted or expected
5. Emergencies require immediate action

Due to these five characteristics, bystanders go through cognitive and behavioural processes:

1. Notice that something is going on
2. Interpret the situation as being an emergency
3. Degree of responsibility felt
4. Form of assistance
5. Implement the action choice

Notice: To test the concept of "noticing", Latane and Darley (1968) staged an emergency using Columbia University students. The students were placed in a room—either alone, with two strangers or with three strangers to complete a questionnaire while they waited for the experimenter to return. While they were completing the questionnaire, smoke was pumped into the room through a wall vent to simulate an emergency. When students were working alone they noticed the smoke almost immediately (within 5 seconds). However, students who were working in groups took longer (up to 20 seconds) to notice the smoke. Latané and Darley claimed this phenomenon could be explained by the social norm of what is considered polite etiquette in public. In most Western cultures, politeness dictates that it is inappropriate to look around idly. This may indicate that a person is nosy or rude. As a result, passers-by are more likely to keep their attention to themselves around large groups than when alone. People who are alone are more likely to be conscious of their surroundings and therefore more likely to notice a person in need of assistance.

Interpret: Once a situation has been noticed, a bystander may be encouraged to intervene if they interpret the incident as an emergency. According to the principle of social influence, bystanders monitor the reactions of other people in an emergency situation to see if others think that it is necessary to intervene. If it is determined that others are not reacting to the situation, bystanders will interpret the situation as not an emergency and will not intervene. This is an example of pluralistic ignorance or social proof. Referring to the smoke experiment, even though students in the groups had clearly noticed the smoke which had become so thick that it was obscuring their vision, irritating their eyes or causing them to cough, they were still unlikely to report it. Only one participant in the group condition reported the smoke within the first four minutes, and by the end of the experiment, no one from five of eight groups had reported the smoke at all. In the groups that did not report the smoke, interpretations of its cause and the likelihood that it was genuinely threatening was also less serious, with no one suggesting fire as a possible cause, but some preferring less serious explanations, such as that the air-conditioner was leaking. Similarly, interpretations of the context played an important role in people's reactions to a man and woman fighting in the street. When the woman yelled, "Get away from me; I don't know you," bystanders intervened 65 percent of the time, but only 19 percent of the time when the woman yelled, "Get away from me; I don't know why I ever married you."

General bystander effect research was mainly conducted in the context of non-dangerous, non-violent emergencies. A study (2006) tested the bystander effect in emergency situations to see if they would get the same results as other studies testing non-emergencies. In situations with low potential danger, significantly more help was given when the person was alone than when they were around another person. However, in situations with great potential danger, participants confronted with an emergency alone or in the presence of another person were similarly likely to help the victim. This suggests that in situations of greater seriousness, it is more likely that people will interpret the situation as one in which help is needed and will be more likely to intervene.

Degree of responsibility: Darley and Latané determined that the degree of responsibility a bystander feels is dependent on three things:

1. Whether or not they feel the person is deserving of help
2. The competence of the bystander
3. The relationship between the bystander and the victim

Forms of assistance: There are two categories of assistance as defined by Latané and Darley:

1. Direct intervention: directly assisting the victim
2. Detour intervention. Detour intervention refers to reporting an emergency to the authorities (i.e. the police, fire department)

Implementation: After going through steps 1–4, the bystander must implement the action.

In one study done by Abraham S. Ross, the effects of increased responsibility on bystander intervention were studied by increasing the presence of children. This study was based on the reactions of 36 male undergraduates presented with emergency situations. The prediction was that intervention would peak due to the presence of children around those 36 male undergraduate participants. This was tested and showed that the prediction was not supported, and it was concluded that "the type of study did not result in significant differences in intervention."

A meta-analysis (2011) of the bystander effect reported that "The bystander effect was attenuated when situations were perceived as dangerous (compared with non-dangerous), perpetrators were present (compared with non-present), and the costs of intervention were physical (compared with non-physical). This pattern of findings is consistent with the arousal-cost-reward model, which proposes that dangerous emergencies are recognized faster and more clearly as real emergencies, thereby inducing higher levels of arousal and hence more helping." They also "identified situations where bystanders provide welcome physical support for the potentially intervening individual and thus reduce the bystander effect, such as when the bystanders were exclusively male, when they were naive rather than passive confederates or only virtually present persons, and when the bystanders were not strangers."

An alternative explanation has been proposed by Stanley Milgram, who hypothesized that the bystanders' callous behavior was caused by the strategies they had adopted in daily life to cope with information overload. This idea has been supported to varying degrees by empirical research.

Timothy Hart and Ternace Miethe used data from the National Crime Victimization Survey (NCVS) and found that a bystander was present in 65 percent of the violent victimizations in the data. Their presence was most common in cases of physical assaults (68%), which accounted for the majority of these violent victimizations and less likely in robberies (49%) and sexual assaults (28%). The actions of bystanders were most frequently judged by victims as "neither helping nor hurting" (48%), followed by "helping" (37%), "hurting" (10%), and "both helping and hurting" (3%). Half of the attacks in which a bystander was present occurred in the evening, when the victim and bystander were strangers.

==== Ambiguity and consequences ====
Ambiguity affects whether a person assists another in need. In some cases of high ambiguity, it can take a person or group up to five times as long before taking action as in cases of low ambiguity. In these cases, bystanders determine their own safety before proceeding. Bystanders are more likely to intervene in low-ambiguity, insignificant-consequence situations than in high-ambiguity, significant-consequence situations.

Latané and Rodin (1969) suggested that in ambiguous situations, bystanders may look to one another for guidance, and misinterpret others' lack of initial response as a lack of concern. This causes each bystander to decide that the situation is not serious.

==== Understanding of environment ====
Whether a bystander intervenes may have to do with their familiarity with the environment where the emergency occurs. If the bystander is familiar with the environment, they are more likely to know where to get help, where the exits are, etc. Bystanders who are in an environment in which they are not familiar with the surroundings are less likely to give help in an emergency situation.

==== Priming the bystander effect ====
Research done by Garcia et al. (2002) indicates that priming a social context may inhibit helping behavior. Imagining being around one other person or being around a group of people can affect a person's willingness to help.

==== Cohesiveness and group membership ====
Group cohesiveness is another variable that can affect the helping behaviour of a bystander. As defined by Rutkowski et al., cohesiveness refers to an established relationship (friends, acquaintances) between two or more people. Experiments have been done to test the performance of bystanders when they are in groups with people they have been acquainted with. According to Rutkowski et al., the social responsibility norm affects helping behavior. The norm of social responsibility states that "people should help others who are in need of help and who are dependent on them for it." As suggested by the research, the more cohesive a group, the more likely the group will act in accordance with the social responsibility norm. To test this hypothesis, researchers used undergraduate students and divided them into four groups: a low-cohesion group with two people, a low-cohesion group with four people, a high-cohesion group with two people, and a high-cohesion group with four people. Students in the high cohesive group were then acquainted with each other by introducing themselves and discussing what they liked/disliked about school and other similar topics. The point of the experiment was to determine whether high-cohesion groups were more willing to help a hurt "victim" than low-cohesion groups. The four-member high-cohesion groups were the quickest and most likely groups to respond to the victim whom they believed to be hurt. The four-member low-cohesive groups were the slowest and least likely to respond to the victim.

Altruism research suggests that helping behaviour is more likely when there are similarities between the helper and the person being helped. Recent research has considered the role of similarity, and more specifically, shared group membership, in encouraging bystander intervention. In one experiment (2005), researchers found that bystanders were more likely to help an injured person if that person was wearing a football jersey of a team the bystander liked as opposed to a team the bystander did not like. However, when their shared identity as football fans was made salient, supporters of both teams were likely to be helped, significantly more so than a person wearing a plain shirt.

The findings of Mark Levine and Simon Crowther (2008) illustrated that increasing group size inhibited intervention in a street violence scenario when bystanders were strangers, but encouraged intervention when bystanders were friends. They also found that when gender identity is salient, group size encouraged intervention when bystanders and victims shared social category membership. In addition, group size interacted with context-specific norms that both inhibit and encourage helping. The bystander effect is not a generic consequence of increasing group size. When bystanders share group-level psychological relationships, group size can encourage as well as inhibit helping.

These findings can be explained in terms of self-categorization and empathy. From the perspective of self-categorization theory, a person's social identity and well-being are tied to group membership so when a group-based identity is salient, the suffering of one group member can be considered to directly affect the group. Because of this shared identity, referred to as self-other merging, bystanders are able to empathize, which has been found to predict helping behaviour. For example, in a study relating to helping after eviction both social identification and empathy were found to predict helping. However, when social identification was controlled for, empathy no longer predicted helping behaviour.

==== Cultural differences ====
In discussing the case of Wang Yue and a later incident in China, in which CCTV footage from a Shanghai subway showed passengers fleeing from a foreigner who fainted, UCLA anthropologist Yunxiang Yan said that the reactions can be explained not only by previous reports of scamming from older people for helping, but also by historical cultural differences in Chinese agrarian society, in which there was a stark contrast between how individuals associated with ingroup and outgroup members, saying, "How to treat strangers nicely is one of the biggest challenges in contemporary Chinese society...The prevailing ethical system in traditional China is based on close-knit community ties, kinship ties." He continued, "A person might treat other people in the person's social group very, very nicely... But turn around, when facing to a stranger, and (a person might) tend to be very suspicious. And whenever possible, might take advantage of that stranger." Despite this, Yan thought Chinese society was moving in a more positive direction, with the younger generation having more inclusive values as a result of growing up in a more globalized society.

In India, the phenomenon of bystanders failing to help after witnessing violent incidents has also been partly attributed to culture. Indian sociologist Ashis Nandy contended it was due to the "increasing brutalisation of our society" which resulted from "rapid cultural change and the change in education standards". According to psychologist Devika Kapoor, the bystander effect in India "seems more pronounced because of our cultural conditioning. We're often told to mind our own business as young kids and not ask questions. This then carries into our adult lives too, where we choose to isolate ourselves from situations that don't concern us."

==== Diffusion of responsibility ====
Darley and Latané (1968) conducted research on diffusion of responsibility. The findings suggest that in the case of an emergency, when people believe that there are other people around, they are less likely or slower to help a victim because they believe someone else will take responsibility. People may also fail to take responsibility for a situation depending on the context. They may assume that other bystanders are more qualified to help, such as doctors or police officers, and that their intervention would be unneeded. They may also be afraid of being superseded by a superior helper, offering unwanted assistance, or facing the legal consequences of offering inferior and possibly dangerous assistance. For this reason, some legislation, such as "Good Samaritan Laws" limit liability for those attempting to provide medical services and non-medical services in an emergency.

Recent research has further shown that diffusion of responsibility is shaped not only by the number of bystanders but by how individuals cognitively interpret the situation. Studies indicate that people are more likely to accept personal responsibility when the emergency is unambiguous or when they feel uniquely capable of helping. Conversely, responsibility is more easily diffused when individuals believe others have greater expertise or when social norms make intervention uncertain. Later work also demonstrates that group identity moderates these effects: bystanders are more willing to intervene when the victim is perceived as part of their ingroup, reducing the tendency to assume that “someone else will help.” These findings expand the original Darley and Latané framework by linking diffusion of responsibility to appraisal processes, social categorization, and contextual cues that shape prosocial behavior.

=== Organizational ombuds practitioners' research ===
A 2009 study published by International Ombudsman Association in the Journal of the International Ombudsman Association suggests that—in reality—there are dozens of reasons why people do not act on the spot or come forward in the workplace when they see behavior they consider unacceptable. The most important reasons cited for not acting were: the fear of loss of important relationships in and out of the workplace, and a fear of "bad consequences". There also were many reasons given by people who did act on the spot or come forward to authorities.

This practitioners' study suggests that the "bystander effect" can be studied and analyzed in a much broader fashion. The broader view includes not just a) what bystanders do in singular emergencies, b) helping strangers in need, when c) there are (or are not) other people around. The reactions of bystanders can also be analyzed a) when the bystanders perceive any of a wide variety of unacceptable behavior over time, b) when they are within an organizational context, and c) with people whom they know. The practitioners' study reported many reasons why some bystanders within organizations do not act or report unacceptable behavior. The study also suggests that bystander behavior is, in fact, often helpful, in terms of acting on the spot to help and reporting unacceptable behavior (and emergencies and people in need). The ombuds practitioners' study suggests that what bystanders will do in real situations is actually very complex, reflecting views of the context and their managers (and relevant organizational structures if any) and also many personal reasons.

In support of the idea that some bystanders do indeed act responsibly, Gerald Koocher and Patricia Keith Spiegel wrote a 2010 article related to an NIH-funded study which showed that informal intervention by peers and bystanders can interrupt or remedy unacceptable scientific behavior.

=== What Would You Do? ===
John Quiñones' primetime show, Primetime: What Would You Do? on ABC, tests the bystander effect. Actors are used to act out (typically non-emergency) situations while the cameras capture the reactions and actions of innocent bystanders. Topics include cheating on a millionaire test, an elderly person shoplifting, racism and homophobia.

=== Non-computer versus computer-mediated intervention ===
Research suggests that the bystander effect may be present in computer-mediated communication situations. Evidence demonstrates that people can be bystanders even when they cannot see the person in distress. In the experiment, 400 online chat groups were observed. One of two confederates was used as a victim in each chat room: either a male victim whose screen name was Jake Harmen or a female victim whose screen name was Suzy Harmen. The purpose of the experiment was to determine whether or not the gender of the victim mattered, if the size of each chat group had any effect and if asking for a person's help by directly using their screen name would have any effect.

Results indicated that the gender of the victim had no effect on whether or not a bystander assisted the victim. Consistent with findings of Latané and Darley, the number of people present in the chat room did have an effect. The response time for smaller chat groups was quicker than in the larger chat groups. However, this effect was nonexistent when the victim (Suzy or Jake) asked for help from a specific person in the chat group. The mean response time for groups in which a specific person was called out was 36.38 seconds. The mean response time for groups in which no screen name was pointed out was 51.53 seconds. A significant finding of the research is that intervention depends on whether or not a victim asked for help by specifying a screen name. The group size effect was inhibited when the victim specifically asked a specific person for help. The group size effect was not inhibited if the victim did not ask a specific person for help.

=== Children as bystanders ===
Although most research has been conducted on adults, children can be bystanders too. A study conducted by Robert Thornberg in 2007 came up with seven reasons why children do not help when another classmate is in distress. These include: trivialisation, dissociation, embarrassment association, 'busy working' priority (the prioritisation of a current task instead of assistance), compliance with a competitive norm (where another social norm applies, a child may instead comply with that norm), audience modelling (modelling of the behaviours of the other audience members), and responsibility transfer (assuming that another person is responsible).

In a further study, Thornberg concluded that there are seven stages of moral deliberation as a bystander in bystander situations among the Swedish schoolchildren he observed and interviewed: (a) noticing that something is wrong, i.e., children pay selective attention to their environment, and sometimes they do not tune in on a distressed peer if they are in a hurry or their view is obstructed, (b) interpreting a need for help—sometimes children think others are just playing rather than actually in distress or they display pluralistic ignorance, (c) feeling empathy, i.e., having tuned in on a situation and concluded that help is needed, children might feel sorry for an injured peer, or angry about unwarranted aggression (empathic anger), (d) processing the school's moral frames—Thornberg identified five contextual ingredients influencing children's behavior in bystander situations (the definition of a good student, tribe caring, gender stereotypes, and social-hierarchy-dependent morality), (e) scanning for social status and relations, i.e., students were less likely to intervene if they did not define themselves as friends of the victim or belonging to the same significant social category as the victim, or if there were high-status students present or involved as aggressors—conversely, lower-status children were more likely to intervene if only a few other low-status children were around, (f) condensing motives for action, such as considering a number of factors such as possible benefits and costs, and (g) acting, i.e., all of the above coalesced into a decision to intervene or not. It is striking how this was less an individual decision than the product of interpersonal and institutional processes.

== Implications of research ==
=== South African murder trials ===
In an effort to make South African courts more just in their convictions, the concept of extenuating circumstances came into being. However, no concrete definition of extenuating circumstances was ever made. South African courts began using testimony of expert social psychologists to define what extenuating circumstances would mean in the justice system. Examples include: deindividuation, bystander apathy, and conformity.

In the case of S. vs. Sibisi and Others (1989) eight members of the South African Railways and Harbours Union were involved in the murder of four workers who chose not to join in the SARHWU strike. Psychologists Scott Fraser and Andrew Colman presented evidence for the defense using research from social psychology. Social anthropologist Boet Kotzé provided evidence for the defense as well. He testified that African cultures are characterized by a collective consciousness. Kotzé testified that the collective consciousness contributed to the defendants' willingness to act with the group rather than as individuals. Fraser and Colman stated that bystander apathy, deindividuation, conformity and group polarization were extenuating factors in the killing of the four strikebreakers. They explained that deindividuation may affect group members' ability to realize they are still accountable for their individual actions even when with a group. They also used research on bystander apathy by Latané and Darley to illustrate why four of the eight defendants watched as the other four defendants killed four men. The testimonies of Fraser and Colman helped four of the defendants escape the death penalty.

=== Laws ===
Some parts of the world have included laws that hold bystanders responsible when they witness an emergency.

1. The Charter of human rights and freedoms of Quebec states that "[e]very person must come to the aid of anyone whose life is in peril, either personally or calling for aid, unless it involves danger to himself or a third person, or he has another valid reason". It is therefore a legal obligation to assist people in danger in Quebec if it is safe to do so.
2. Likewise, the Brazilian Penal Code states that it is a crime not to rescue (or call emergency services when appropriate) injured or disabled people including those found in grave and imminent danger as long as it is safe to do so. This also includes abandoned children.
3. The German penal code makes it a crime for a person to fail to render aid in cases of accidents or other common dangers, unless such person would thereby endanger themselves or it would be contrary to some other important obligation.

In the US, Good Samaritan laws have been implemented to protect bystanders who acted in good faith. Many organizations are including bystander training. For example, the United States Department of the Army is doing bystander training with respect to sexual assault. Some organizations routinely do bystander training with respect to safety issues. Others have been doing bystander training with respect to diversity issues. (Note: See also http://www.clemson.edu/olweus/ for an overview of a use of the Olweus Bullying Prevention Program.) Organizations such as American universities are also using bystander research to improve bystander attitudes in cases of rape. Examples include the InterAct Sexual Assault Prevention program and the Green Dot program. Others have been critical of these laws for being punitive and criminalizing the problem they are meant to address.

Many institutions have worked to provide options for bystanders who see behavior they find unacceptable. These options are usually provided through complaint systems—so bystanders have choices about where to go. One option that is particularly helpful is that of an organizational ombudsman, who keeps no records for the employer and is near-absolutely confidential.

== Notable examples ==
=== Kitty Genovese ===
On March 13, 1964, 28-year-old bartender Catherine "Kitty" Genovese was stabbed, sexually assaulted, and murdered while walking home from work at 3 a.m. in Queens, New York. The case is widely known for originally stimulating social psychological research into the "bystander effect". According to a sensationalized article in The New York Times, 38 witnesses watched the stabbings but did not intervene or even call the police until after the attacker fled and Genovese had died.

The shocking account drew widespread public attention and many newspaper editorials. Psychology researchers Latané and Darley attributed the lack of help by witnesses to diffusion of responsibility: because each witness saw others witnessing the same event, they assumed that the others would be taking responsibility and calling the police, and therefore did nothing to stop the situation themselves.

An article published in American Psychologist in 2007 found that the story of Genovese's murder had been exaggerated by the media. There were far fewer than 38 eyewitnesses; the police were called at least once during the attack, and many of the bystanders who overheard the attack could not actually see the event. In 2016, The New York Times called its own reporting "flawed", stating that the original story "grossly exaggerated the number of witnesses and what they had perceived".

=== Jane Doe of Richmond High ===
On October 24, 2009, a female student at Richmond High School was gang-raped and beaten by a group of boys and men after a classmate invited her to a dark courtyard outside the school's homecoming dance. It was reported that she was treated politely and drank brandy with the group before the assault took place, which lasted two and a half hours before a young woman notified the police. As many as 20 people witnessed the incident, with several reportedly cheering and videotaping it. She was hospitalised for scrapes and bruises all over her face and body, and later sustained scars from cigarette burns on her back, as well as hips that regularly pop out of place. The case drew nationwide outrage in the United States.

=== Raymond Zack ===
On May 30, 2011 (Memorial Day), 53-year-old Raymond Zack of Alameda, California, walked into the waters off Robert Crown Memorial Beach and stood neck-deep in water roughly 150 yards offshore for almost an hour. His foster mother, Dolores Berry, called 9-1-1 and said that he was trying to drown himself. (There are conflicting reports about Zack's intentions. (Note: Many issues about this incident are disputed. Roughly one year after the incident, Raymond Zack's family filed a "Failure of Duty" lawsuit against the City of Alameda and the County of Alameda.)) Firefighters and police responded but did not enter the water. The firefighters called for a United States Coast Guard boat to respond to the scene. According to police reports, Alameda police expected the firefighters to enter the water. (Note: Alameda police released redacted police reports to the media after the event that confirm this.) Firefighters later said that they did not have current training and certifications to perform land-based water rescue. Dozens of civilians on the beach, and watching from their homes across from the beach, did not enter the water, apparently expecting public safety officers to conduct a rescue. Eventually, Zack collapsed in the water, apparently from hypothermia. Even then, nobody entered the water for several minutes. Finally, a good samaritan entered the water and pulled Zack to shore. Zack died afterwards at a local hospital.

=== Piang Ngaih Don ===
In July 2016, a 24-year-old Myanmar citizen and domestic maid Piang Ngaih Don was abused and murdered by her employer Gaiyathiri Murugayan and Gaiyathiri's mother Prema S. Naraynasamy. Both Gaiyathiri and Prema were arrested and charged with murder, while a third accomplice, Gaiyathiri's husband Kevin Chelvam who was then a police officer, was also charged with maid abuse and his police duties were suspended in view of his criminal proceedings. Subsequently, Gaiyathiri was sentenced to 30 years' imprisonment in June 2021 for a lower charge of culpable homicide not amounting to murder. Prema was convicted of multiple charges of maid abuse and destroying evidence and sentenced to 17 years' imprisonment in 2023.

The case invoked public outrage, shock and anger over the extensive cruelty of the case and the death of the maid. Piang's case also demonstrated chilling similarities and comparisons to Kitty Genovese's murder and the existence of the bystander effect, as it was discovered that during the regular health checks at the hospital and the maid agency, there were people who suspected that Piang may have been abused but Gaiyathiri and her family denied it; no police report was made in relation to these suspected signs of maid abuse.

=== Jane Doe of Philadelphia ===
On October 13, 2021, a passenger was sexually harassed and eventually raped by another rider on a SEPTA train in Philadelphia, with several bystanders in the area purportedly witnessing the incident, even allegedly recording the assault on their phones, and failing to alert authorities or stop the assault until one off-duty employee called 911 after boarding the train and noticing the attack. The sexual assault, which went on for nearly 40 minutes, as well as the passengers' apparent lack of action, was recorded on SEPTA surveillance video. After the initial 911 call, a SEPTA officer boarded the train when it arrived at the 69th Street Transportation Center, arresting the suspect after pulling him off the victim.

This assault gained international attention for the passengers' apparent lack of action, though some scholars argued that the bystanders simply did not know what to do in that instance. According to SEPTA general manager Leslie Richards, the arrest occurred 3 minutes after the initial 911 call, which happened after the victim had been harassed for more than half an hour. The organization eventually released a statement, saying, "There were other people on the train who witnessed this horrific act, and it may have been stopped sooner if a rider called 911." However, Delaware County District Attorney Jack Stollsteimer refuted the claim that the bystanders were filming the assault, countering that many of the bystanders may not have understood what they were seeing.

== Counterexample ==
In 2019, a large international cultural anthropology study analyzed 219 street disputes and confrontations that were recorded by security cameras in three cities in different countries: Lancaster, Amsterdam, and Cape Town. Contrary to the hypothesis of the bystander effect, the study found that bystanders intervened in almost every case, and the chance of intervention went up with the number of bystanders, "a highly radical discovery and a completely different outcome than theory predicts".

This study is the first large-scale test of the bystander effect in real-life. Up until now, this effect was mainly studied in the lab by asking study subjects how they would respond in a particular situation. Another striking aspect of this study is that the observations come from three different countries[,] including the violent country of South Africa[,] where intervening in a street dispute is not without risk. [...] Nevertheless, peacemakers do draw a line according to a follow-up study [...] In the case of armed robberies, bystanders intervene far less.

Contradicting the follow-up study mentioned, a 2022 study conducted by one of the same researchers as the initial 2019 study found that the presence of a weapon did not affect whether people would intervene. Unlike most prior studies on the bystander effect, these studies focused on the likelihood of receiving help in a public confrontation at all, rather than simply comparing the difference between the likelihood of bystander intervention when alone or in a group. The 2019 study concluded that the decreased likelihood of a particular person helping was offset by the increased likelihood that at least someone would help. Findings were consistent with other studies that showed lower rates of bystander apathy when the situation was a dangerous emergency.

== See also ==
- Belief perseverance
- Duty to rescue
- Empathy-altruism
- Good Samaritan law
- Lynching
- Omission bias
- One Night (2012 film)
- Rubbernecking
- Social loafing
- Somebody else's problem
- "The Finale" (Seinfeld)
