= Social impact theory =

1981 social theory

Social Impact Theory was created by Bibb Latané in 1981 and uses three principles to describe how individuals can be "sources or targets of social influence". The three principles which determine how social forces create social impact are the strength of the source of impact, the immediacy of the event, and the number of sources exerting the impact. The more targets there are to impact, the less impact each target receives. Social impact theory has been applied to a variety of concepts in psychology including diffusion of responsibility, social loafing, stage fright, and persuasive communication.

== Original research ==
According to psychologist Bibb Latané, social impact is defined as any influence on individual feelings, thoughts, or behaviors that is created from the real, implied, or imagined presence or actions of others. In the original 1981 paper, Latané developed the social impact theory using three key variables:

- Strength (S) is the importance of a person to the individual being influenced. It covers stable, trans-situational, intrapersonal factors - size, intellect, wealth - together with dynamic, situation-specific relational components, such as belonging to the same group.
- Immediacy (I) considers how recently the event occurred and whether or not there were other intervening factors.
- The number of sources (N) refers to the number of sources of influence.

Based on these variables, Latané coined three mathematical principles to describe social impact: social forces, the psychosocial law, and the multiplication/division of impact.

=== Psychosocial law ===
The psychosocial law posits that the impact of any individual sources of social influence decreases as the total number of sources increases. Going from one to two sources will increase the amount of social influence more than going from 99 sources to 100. most significant social impact on an individual will occur from 0 sources to 1 source. The equation Latané uses for this law is $Impact = s\cdot N^t$. That is, the impact of social influence (I) is determined by the number of sources of social influence (N) raised to some power (t) and multiplied by a scaling constant (s). Latané verified this relationship by applying to previous studies on conformity and embarrassment.

Latané found mixed support applying this relation to research on conformity.Solomon Asch's famous conformity experiments among college students challenged this psychosocial law by demonstrating that the amount of social impact was not impacted by the number of sources after a certain point. In contrast, a subsequent study by Gerard, Wilhelmy, and Conolley examined conformity in high school students, who were considered more susceptible to social impact than college students. This study supported the psychosocial law, finding that the strength of social impact increased with the number of sources inline with the proposed equation.

Latané further applied the psychosocial law to imitation, referencing an experiment in part conducted by Stanley Milgram in which varying numbers of confederates stood on a New York City street corner looking up at window on a nearby building. The results indicated that an increased number of confederates led to more passersby imitating the behavior, with the amount of increase reducing as additional confederates were added. Similarly, in a study on stage fright and embarrassment conducted by Latané and Harkins, the findings aligned with the psychosocial law, showing that an increase in audience size correlated with heightened anxiety, with the main impact occurring between no audience and a single audience member.

=== Multiplication/divisions of impact ===
Latané's multiplication/divisions of impact states that the strength, immediacy, and number of targets of social influence has an inverse relation with social impact as the strength, immediacy, and number of source of social influence. As the strength, immediacy, and number of targets of social influence increase in a social situation, the impact of the social influence decreases. The equation that represents this division is $Impact = sN^{-t}$. ` This law comes from Latané's work on diffusion of responsibility, in which individuals feel less accountable as the number of people present increases. Latané argues that this law is in line with the Bystander effect in which, emergency situations, the impact of the emergency is reduced when more people are present. Latané argued that his model fit a variety of studies on the diffusion of responsibility.

=== Strengths and Weaknesses ===
The social impact theory is both generalizable and specific. It is general because it uses one set of equations, which apply to many social situations. For example, the psychosocial law can predict conformity, imitation, and embarrassment. Yet, it is also specific because the predictions that it makes are specific and can be applied to and observed in the world. The theory is falsifiable in that it predicts specific, mathematically described predictions which can be tested. The original research found that social impact theory is able to fit a variety of preexisting results which adds to validity.

While social impact theory explores social situations and can help predict their outcomes, it also has some shortcomings and unresolved questions. The rules guiding the theory depict people as recipients who passively accept social impact and do not take into account the social impact that people may actively seek. The model is also static and does not fully compensate for the dynamics involved in social interactions. The theory fails to address some pertinent issues. These issues include finding more accurate ways to measure social outcomes, understanding the "t" exponent in psychosocial law, taking susceptibility into account, understanding how short-term consequences can develop into chronic consequences, applying to group interactions, and understanding the model's nature (descriptive vs. explanatory, generalization of results vs. theory).

== Applying social impact theory ==
The social impact theory specifies the effects of social variables - strength, immediacy, and number of sources - but does not explain the nature of these influencing processes. Various factors are not considered by experimenters while implementing the theory. Concepts such as peripheral persuasion affect how communicators may be more credible to some individuals and untrustworthy to others. The variables are inconsistent from individual to individual, possibly associating strength with source credibility and attractiveness or immediacy with physical closeness. Therefore, in the social impact theory's application, the idea of persuasiveness, the ability to induce someone with an opposing position to change and supportiveness, the ability to help those who agree with someone's point of view to resist the influence of others, is introduced. Ultimately, an individual's likelihood of change and being influenced is a direct function of strength (persuasiveness), immediacy, and the number of advocates, and is a direct inverse function of strength (supportiveness), immediacy, and number of target individuals.

== Subsequent development ==
The dynamic social impact theory, as proposed by Bibb Latané and his colleagues, describes the influence of members between majority and minority groups. The theory serves as an extension of the originating social impact theory (i.e., influence is determined by the strength, immediacy, and number of sources present) as it explains how groups, as complex systems, change and develop over time. Groups are constantly organizing and re-organizing into four basic patterns: consolidation, clustering, correlation, and continuing diversity. These patterns are consistent with groups that are spatially distributed and interact repeatedly over time.

1. Consolidation - as individuals interact with each other regularly, their actions, attitudes, and opinions become more uniform. The opinions held by the majority tend to spread throughout the group, while the minority decreases in size.

- E.g., Individuals who live in the same college dormitory will, over time, develop similar attitudes on various topics.

2. Clustering - occurs when group members communicate more frequently due to proximity. As the law of social impact suggests, individuals are susceptible to influence by their closest members, and so clusters of group members with similar opinions emerge in groups. Minority group members are often shielded from majority influence due to clustering. Therefore, subgroups can emerge that may possess similar ideas to one another but hold different beliefs than the majority population.

- E.g., Neighbours on a suburban street convince other neighbors to form a community-watch group.

3. Correlation - over time, individual group members' opinions on various issues (including issues that have never been openly discussed before) converge so that their views become correlated.

- E.g., Individuals in an executive society (i.e., Board of Directors) may agree on topics they have discussed throughout a conference - such as the best financial plan- but they also agree on topics they have never discussed: the best restaurant to eat in the city.

4. Continuing diversity - as mentioned previously, minority members are often shielded from majority influence due to clustering. Diversity exists if the minority group can resist the majority's influence and communicate with majority members. However, if the majority is large or minority members are physically isolated from one another, this diversity decreases.

- E.g., A jury of 10 members convenes in a boardroom to provide a final verdict (which must be unanimous). Two jury members disagree with the majority and delay the final decision (continues diversity).

== Contemporary research ==
In 1985, Mullen conducted a meta-analysis on the validity of two factors that Latané associated with social impact theory: source strength and immediacy. The studies that were analyzed were sorted by the method of measurement used, with the self-reported data in one category and the behavior measurements in the other category. Mullen's results showed that the source strength and immediacy were only supported in cases in which tension was self-reported and not when behavior was measured. He thus concluded that Latané's source strength and immediacy were weak and lacked consistency. Critics of Mullen's study, however, argue that perhaps not enough studies were available or included, which may have skewed his results and given him an inaccurate conclusion.

A study conducted by Constantine Sedikides and Jeffrey M. Jackson took another look at the role of strength within social impact theory. This study was conducted in a birdhouse at a zoo. In one scenario, an experimenter dressed as a birdkeeper walked into the birdhouse and told visitors that leaning on the railing was prohibited. This was considered a high-strength scenario because of the authority that a zookeeper possesses within a zoo. The other scenario involved an experimenter dressed in ordinary clothes addressing the visitors with the same message. The study results showed that visitors responded better to the high-strength scenario, with fewer individuals leaning on the railing after the zookeeper had told them not to. The study also tested the effect that immediacy had on social impact. This was done by measuring the incidences of leaning on the rail immediately after the message was delivered and later. The results showed that immediacy played a role in determining social impact since fewer people leaned on the rails immediately after the message. The visitors in the birdhouse were studied as members of the group they came with to determine how the number of targets would influence the targets' behavior. The group size ranged from 1 to 6, and the results showed that those in larger groups were less likely to comply with the experimenter's message than those in smaller groups. All of these findings support the parameters of Latané's social impact theory.

Kipling D. Williams and Karen B. Williams theorized that social impact would vary depending on the underlying motive of compliance. Stronger sources should produce a greater social impact when compliance is simply a mechanism for creating a positive impression. When it is an internal motive that induces compliance, the strength of the source shouldn't matter. Williams and Williams designed a study in which two persuasion methods were utilized, one that would evoke external motivation and one that would evoke internal motivation. Using these techniques, experimenters went from door to door using one of the techniques to attempt to collect money for a zoo. The foot-in-the-door technique was utilized to evoke the internal motive. In this technique, the experimenter would make an initial request that was relatively small and gradually request larger and larger amounts. This is internally motivated because the target's self-perception is altered to feel more helpful after the original contribution. The door-in-the-face technique, on the other hand, involves the experimenter asking for a huge amount first, and when the target declines, they ask for a much smaller amount as a concession. This technique draws on external motivation because the request for a concession makes one feel obliged to comply. The experiment was conducted with low-strength and high-strength experimenters. Those who were approached by higher-strength experimenters were more likely to contribute money. Using the different persuasion approaches did not produce statistically significant results; however, it did support Williams and Williams' hypothesis that the strength of the experimenter would heighten the effects of the door-in-the-face technique but have minimal impact on the foot-in-the-door technique

One study by Helen Harton and colleagues examined the four patterns of the dynamic social impact theory. The study included one large (six rows of 15-30 people) and two small introductory psychology classes (one group per class). Ten questions were chosen from course readings and either distributed as a hand-out, read aloud, or presented on an overhead projector. Students were given ~1 minute per question to mark their pre-discussion answers. The students were then instructed to discuss each question for 1 or 2 minutes with their neighbors (on either side), but only about the assigned questions - which answer they chose and why. There was little initial diversity on two questions - one was too easy (the majority got it), and the other was too difficult (the majority agreed on the wrong answer). Consolidation- overall, discussion-induced consolidation occurred in 7 of the 8 independent groups, indicating that majority members converted into minority members. Clustering- before the discussion, neighbors' answers were evenly distributed. Post-discussion, groups exhibited a significant degree of spatial clustering, as neighbors influenced each other to become more similar. Correlation- an increased tendency for an answer to one question to be associated with an answer to another question completely unrelated content-wise. Continuing Diversity- none of the 8 groups reached unanimity on any of the questions, meaning that minority group members did not conform to majority group members.

Due to social media's influence, there has been a movement towards e-commerce. Researchers have since looked into the relationship between social media influence and visit and purchase intentions within individuals.

Most recently, Rodrigo Perez-Vega, Kathryn Waite, and Kevin O'Gorman suggested that the theory is also relevant in social media. Empirical research in this context has found support for the effects of the numbers of sources (i.e. likes) in performance outcomes such as box office sales. Furthermore, Babajide Osatuyi and Katia Passerini operationalized strength, immediacy, and number using Social Network Analysis centrality measures, i.e., betweenness, closeness, and degree centralities to test two of the rules stipulated in social impact theory. They compared the influence of using Twitter and discussion boards in a learning management system (e.g., Moodle and Blackboard) on student performance, measured as the final grade in a course. The results supported the first law, i.e., impact (grade) as a multiplicative resultant of strength, immediacy, and number of interactions among students. Additional interesting insights were observed in this study that educators ought to consider to maximize the integration of new social technologies into pedagogy.

== Sources ==
- Latané, B (1981). "The psychology of social impact". American Psychologist. 36 (4): 343–356. doi:10.1037/0003-066X.36.4.343. S2CID 145324374.
- Latané, B.; L' Herrou, T. (1996). "Spatial clustering in the conformity game:Dynamic social impact in electronic games". Journal of Personality and Social Psychology. 70 (6): 1218–1230. doi:10.1037/0022-3514.70.6.1218.
- Sedikides, C.; Jackson, J.M. (1990). "Social impact theory: a field test of source strength, source immediacy, and number of targets". Basic and Applied Social Psychology. 11 (3): 273–281. doi:10.1207/s15324834basp1103_4.
- Williams, K.D.; Williams, K.B. (1989). "Impact of source strength on two compliance techniques". Basic and Applied Social Psychology. 10 (2): 149–159. doi:10.1207/s15324834basp1002_5.
- Kwahk, K.Y.; Ge, X. (2012). "The Effects of Social Media on E-Commerce: A Perspective of Social Impact Theory". 2012 45th Hawaii International Conference on System Sciences. pp. 1814–1823. doi:10.1109/HICSS.2012.564. ISBN 978-1-4577-1925-7. S2CID 7659922.
- Nowak, Andrzej; Szamrej, Jacek; Latané, Bibb (1990). "From private attitude to public opinion: A dynamic theory of social impact". Psychological Review. 97 (3): 362–376. doi:10.1037/0033-295X.97.3.362.
- Latané, Bibb (1996). "Dynamic Social Impact: The Creation of Culture by Communication". Journal of Communication. 46 (4): 13–25. doi:10.1111/j.1460-2466.1996.tb01501.x.
