= Ringelmann =

Ringelmann is a surname. Notable people with the surname include:

- Helmut Ringelmann (1926–2011), German film and television producer
- Max Ringelmann (1861–1931), French professor of agricultural engineering
