= Silent treatment =

Refusal to communicate with someone who desires communication

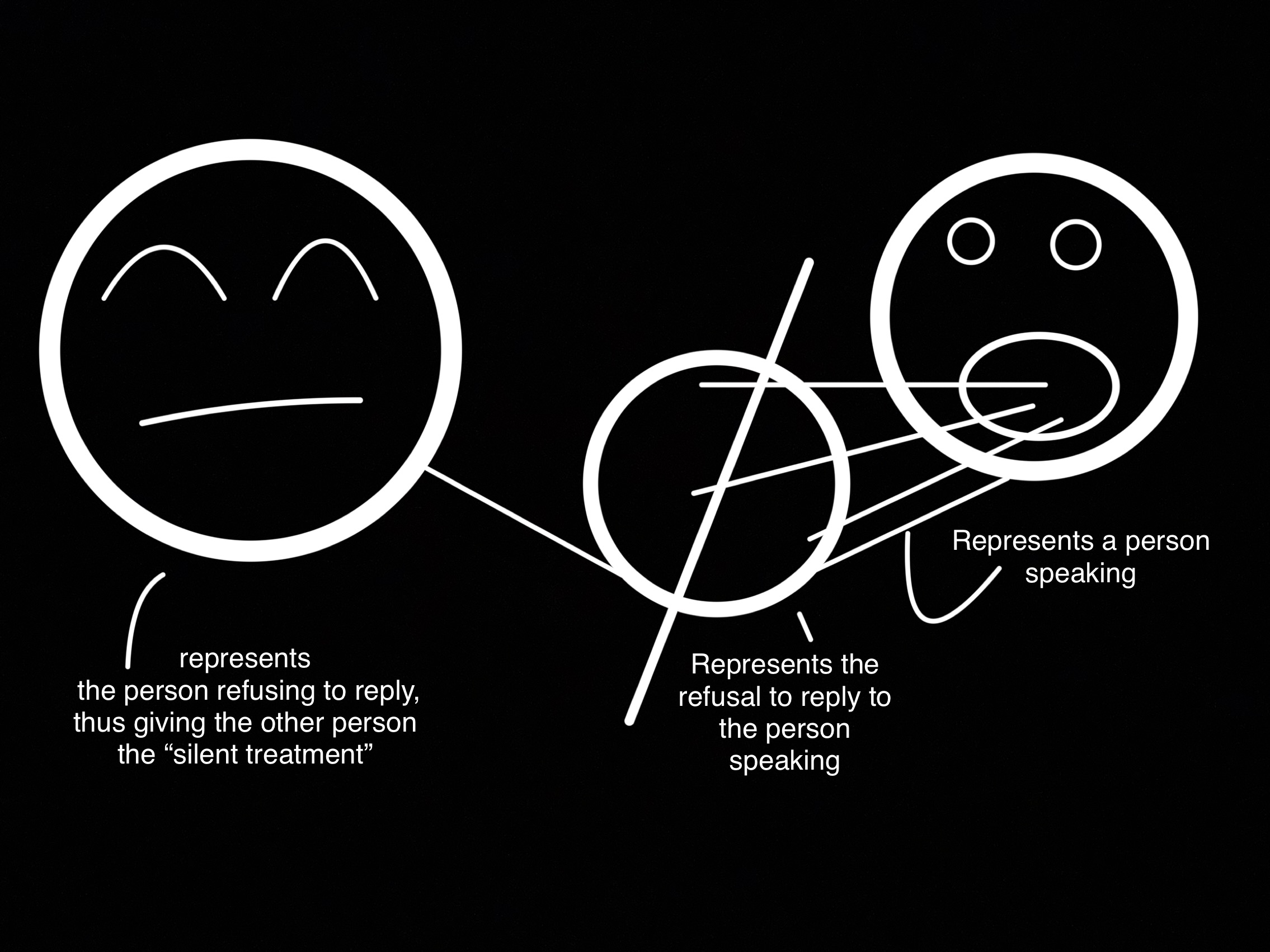

Silent treatment refers to not talking to someone, possibly following conflict, hurt, anger, or emotional distress. It can take many forms and have very different motivations and meanings. It may range from just sulking, to a self protective response or a coping mechanism, where one may withdraw because they feel overwhelmed, hurt, inadequate, or unable to express their emotions safely, to a form of deliberate psychological manipulation.

According to couple therapist Figs O'Sullivan, it is not necessarily abusive or even malevolent, and might range from protective silence as a survival mechanism, to a learned behavior, not necessarily malicious, possibly stemming from growing up in an environment where openly expressing anger or disagreement was discouraged or unsafe, to an intentional, sustained manipulation designed to break down the other person in order to dominate them, which gets into emotional abuse territory.

In educational settings, a practice known as planned ignoring may be used by teachers to address minor attention seeking or disruptive behaviors. Rather than engaging with the behavior, the teacher temporarily withholds attention while continuing to maintain appropriate classroom expectations. According to Sally Scollay Booth this is a highly utilised and valuable tool.. In social groups, according to the social psychologist Kipling Williams, prolonged silence or exclusion can also function as social rejection or ostracism, effectively communicating that an individual is being excluded from the group.

== Origin of term ==
The term originated from "treatment" through silence, which was fashionable in European and American prisons in the 19th century, such as in the Auburn system. "In use since the prison reforms of 1835, the silent treatment was used in prisons as an alternative to physical punishment, as it was believed that forbidding prisoners from speaking, calling them by a number rather than their name, and making them cover their faces so they couldn't see each other would encourage reflection on their crimes".

== In interpersonal relationships ==
Silent treatment might occur in various types of interpersonal relationships, such as friendships, working relationships, romantic ones, or parent-child relationships. It can be a difficult issue to resolve because if it is ingrained, relationships may gradually deteriorate, and while it might be seen as a form of self-protection, it might instead lead the partner to use more aggressive forms of behavior.

In terms of the socialization of silent treatment in parent-child relationships, adult children's self-reported silent-treatment behaviors were negatively related to their own self-esteem, and the satisfaction they reported for their primary parent was negatively related to that parent's silent treatment. The parent's admitting displeasure, however, was positively related to this satisfaction and positively associated with the child's feelings of control. Revealed sex differences were minor and outside of gendered expectations for communicating disappointment. In testing parent socialization of the silent treatment, parent silent-treatment use was positively associated with the adult child's silent-treatment use, with no demonstrated mediation by parent identification.

In some cases, the enactors of silent treatment might mean to punish the other person by refusing to speak to them or even acknowledge their presence, such as in the case of parent-child relationship, or they might communicate through silence their displeasure, anger, upset and frustration.. It might not be done maliciously, but as a form of self protection, or a reaction to having lived through situations where explicitly expressing anger was forbidden or unsafe, however, paradoxically, rather than avoiding conflict, it might elicit a maladaptive response from the other person, if they have high rejection sensitivity levels, potentially leading to a violent reaction. In other cases, purposeful silence may be a form of attention seeking behavior and could generate desired responses, such as attention, or a feeling of power from creating uncertainty for the person on the receiving end, but might ultimately be psychologically exhausting for all involved parties and lead to the irreparable deterioration of the interpersonal relationship.

Couple therapist Figs O'Sullivan emphasises that silent treatment is not a monolithic behavior, it exists on a spectrum. On one end there is protective silence, where the person is not choosing to withhold communication as a strategy: rather, it is a survival response when an argument escalates, where one retreats into themselves. It is not driven by arrogance, but rather it is "the collapse of a person who feels they are serving a life sentence of never being enough". Such people "use distance to survive the agonizing pain of inadequacy". Then there are those who want the other to know they are upset without telling them why, often as a learned behavior, not necessarily malicious, possibly caused by experiences like growing up in a home where direct expression of anger was forbidden or dangerous. They might not be confrontational, and feel uncomfortable openly talking about being angry or upset, possibly thinking it might make things worse, or in some cases that it would be unsafe. At the far end of the spectrum, there is deliberate, prolonged manipulation, aimed at breaking down the other person in order to establish dominance over them, crossing into emotional abuse.

== Tactical ignoring ==
In addition to what was discussed in the role of the silent treatment in interpersonal relationship, it can also be used to promote behavioral change. Tactical ignoring is a strategy where a person gives no outward sign of recognizing a behavior, such as no eye contact, no verbal or physical response, or acknowledgment that a message has been read. However, it is a very active process as the person remains acutely aware of the behavior and monitors the individual to observe what the individual has planned and ensure their safety or the safety of others. It is a technique that is often employed in parent-child relationships and is similar to the silent treatment because tactical ignoring is a behavioral management technique that, when correctly applied, can convey the message that a person's behavior will not lead to their desired outcome. It may also result in the reduction of undesirable behaviors.

Tactical ignoring can be one element of a behavior management plan when there are a variety of challenging behaviors being addressed. Because it is a method that involves not responding to an undesirable behavior, it should be complemented by differential reinforcement for an alternative behavior, as seen in functional communication training, a procedure to teach a more appropriate attention-seeking behavior.

== See also ==
- Cold shoulder
- Destabilisation
- Ghosting (behavior)
- Guilt trip
- Isolation to facilitate abuse
- Ostracism
- Send to Coventry
- Shunning
- Social exclusion
- Social isolation
- Stonewalling
