= Kipling Williams =

American psychologist

Kipling D. Williams is an American social psychologist and Distinguished Professor Emeritus of Psychological Sciences at Purdue University in West Lafayette, Indiana. He is known for his research on ostracism, social exclusion, and the psychological and behavioral consequences of being ignored or excluded by others.

== Education ==
He received B.S. in Psychology at the University of Washington in 1975.

Williams received his Ph.D. in Social Psychology from The Ohio State University in 1981. His graduate training at Ohio State helped shape his foundational interests in social influence, group processes, and interpersonal dynamics. He was an associate editor of both the Personality and Social Psychology Bulletin and Group Dynamics: Theory, Research, and Practice. He is currently the editor of Social Influence.

== Academic career ==
Williams has held academic appointments at several universities, including Macquarie University and the University of New South Wales in Australia, the University of Toledo, and Drake University, before joining the faculty at Purdue University. At Purdue, he served as a professor in the Department of Psychological Sciences and is now a Distinguished Professor Emeritus.

== Research and Contributions ==
Williams's research spans several areas of social psychology, but he is most widely recognized for his work on ostracism the experience of being ignored and excluded by others.

His recent research continues to drive the field's understanding of how being ignored and excluded impact psychological well‑being including social pain, isolation, coping strategies, and long‑term outcomes such as depression and social withdrawal. For example, his 2022 review with Steve A. Nida synthesizes decades of research on ostracism's emotional, cognitive, and behavioral effects and highlights future directions for interventions and recovery strategies.

=== Ostracism and Social Exclusion ===
Williams defines ostracism as "any act or acts of ignoring and excluding of an individual or groups by an individual or a group" without necessarily involving overt verbal or physical abuse. This conceptualization emphasizes the silent and subtle nature of many exclusionary acts.

His work has shown that even brief episodes of ostracism threaten fundamental human needs such as belonging, self-esteem, control, and meaningful existence, and that ostracism can cause emotional pain, stress, and behavioral changes.

Williams developed the Temporal Need-Threat Model, a framework used to explain the psychological stages people experience in response to social exclusion beginning with reflexive responses, followed by attempts to cope, and potentially long-term resignation when ostracism persists.

In the reflexive stage, individuals are nearly universally negatively impacted by even brief episodes of ostracism, involving self-reported pain and brain activity associated with the detection of pain, threatened needs of belonging, self-esteem, control, and meaningful existence, and negative emotions, such as sadness and anger.

=== Cyberball Paradigm ===
Williams along with Christopher Cheung and Wilma Choi created the Cyberball paradigm, a widely used experimental tool in social psychology for studying ostracism in controlled settings. In this virtual ball-tossing game, participants are ostracized by not being thrown the ball by virtual players, which reliably induces feelings of exclusion.

Cyberball has been updated multiple times (the latest known version being Cyberball 5.0) and remains a standard research tool in studies of social exclusion, rejection, discrimination, and interpersonal acceptance.

=== Social loafing ===
Kipling D. Williams is closely associated with the development and empirical study of the concept of social loafing, a phenomenon in social psychology describing the tendency of individuals to exert less effort when working in groups compared to when working alone. The concept was formally articulated in the influential study by Bibb Latané, Williams, and Stephen Harkins (1979), which demonstrated that individual effort decreases as group size increases under certain conditions.

This foundational work, "Many hands make light the work: The causes and consequences of social loafing", has been widely cited in the psychological literature and is regarded as a key contribution to the study of group dynamics. It provided experimental evidence for diffusion of responsibility and motivational losses in collective tasks, helping to establish social loafing as a major topic within social and organizational psychology.

Williams further contributed to the theoretical and empirical development of the concept through a substantial body of research, including multiple peer-reviewed publications examining the conditions under which social loafing occurs and how it can be mitigated. A major synthesis of this research is presented in the meta-analytic review by Steven J. Karau and Williams (1993), which integrated findings across numerous studies and proposed a comprehensive theoretical framework for understanding effort reduction in group settings.

This body of work has had significant influence across disciplines, including psychology, management, education, and organizational behavior. It has informed research on teamwork, productivity, and collective performance, as well as practical strategies for reducing motivational losses in group contexts, such as increasing individual accountability, enhancing task significance, and improving group cohesion.

== Selected publications ==
- Kipling D. Williams (1997). Social ostracism. In R. M. Kowalski (Ed.), Aversive interpersonal behaviors (pp. 133–170). Plenum Press.
- Kipling D. Williams, K. D., & Sommer, K. L. (1997). Social ostracism by one's coworkers: Does rejection lead to loafing or compensation? Personality and Social Psychology Bulletin.
- Kipling D. Williams, K. D., & Zadro, L. (2001). Ostracism: On being ignored, excluded, and rejected. In M. R. Leary (Ed.), Interpersonal rejection (pp. 21–53). Oxford University Press.
- Forgas, J. P., & Kipling D. Williams (Eds.). (2001). Social influence: Direct and indirect processes. Psychology Press.
- Forgas, J. P., Kipling D. Williams, & Wheeler, L. (Eds.). (2001). The social mind: Cognitive and motivational aspects of interpersonal behavior. Cambridge University Press.
- Forgas, J. P., & Kipling D. Williams (Eds.). (2002). The social self: Cognitive, interpersonal, and intergroup perspectives. Psychology Press.
- Forgas, J. P., Kipling D. Williams, & von Hippel, W. (Eds.). (2003). Social judgments: Implicit and explicit processes. Cambridge University Press.
- Eisenberger, N. I., Lieberman, M. D., & Kipling D. Williams (2003). Does rejection hurt? An fMRI study of social exclusion. Science.
- Forgas, J. P., Kipling D. Williams, & von Hippel, W. (Eds.). (2005). Social motivation: Conscious and unconscious processes. Cambridge University Press.
- Kipling D. Williams, K. D., Forgas, J. P., & von Hippel, W. (Eds.). (2005). The social outcast: Ostracism, social exclusion, rejection, and bullying. Psychology Press.
- Williams, K. D. (2007). Ostracism. Annual Review of Psychology.
- Brewer, N., & Kipling D. Williams (Eds.). (2007). Psychology and law: An empirical perspective. Cambridge University Press.
- Gonsalkorale, K., & Kipling D. Williams (2007). The KKK won't let me play: Ostracism even by a despised outgroup hurts. European Journal of Social Psychology
- Zadro, L., Arriaga, X. B., & Kipling D. Williams (2008). Relational ostracism. In J. P. Forgas & J. Fitness (Eds.), Social relationships: Cognitive, affective, and motivational processes (pp. 305–320). Psychology Press.
- Williams, K. D. (2009). Ostracism: A temporal need-threat model. Advances in Experimental Social Psychology.
- Williams, K. D., Cheung, C. K. T., & Choi, W. (2006). Cyberball: A program for use in research on interpersonal ostracism and acceptance. Behavior Research Methods.
- Goodwin, S. A., Kipling D. Williams, & Carter-Sowell, A. R. (2010). The psychological sting of stigma: The costs of attributing ostracism to racism. Journal of Experimental Social Psychology.
- Jamieson, J. P., Harkins, S. G., & Kipling D. Williams (2010). Need threat can motivate performance after ostracism. Personality and Social Psychology Bulletin.
- Nezlek, J. B., Wesselmann, E. D., Wheeler, L., & Kipling D. Williams (2012). Ostracism in everyday life. Group Dynamics: Theory, Research, and Practice.
- Hartgerink, C. H. J., van Beest, I., Wicherts, J. M., & Kipling D. Williams (2015). The ordinal effects of ostracism: A meta-analysis of 120 Cyberball studies. PLOS ONE.
- Kipling D. Williams, K. D., & Nida, S. A. (Eds.). (2017). Ostracism, exclusion, and rejection. Routledge.
- Harkins, S. G., Kipling D. Williams, & Burger, J. M. (Eds.). (2017). The Oxford handbook of social influence. Oxford University Press.
- Rudert, S. C., Greifeneder, R., & Kipling D. Williams (Eds.). (2019). Current directions in ostracism, social exclusion, and rejection research. Routledge.
- Hales, A. H., Wood, N. R., & Kipling D. Williams (2024). Ostracism and extremism. In M. Pfundmair, A. H. Hales, & K. D. Williams (Eds.), Exclusion and extremism: A psychological perspective. Cambridge University Press.
