= Fairness dilemmas =

Problems with resource sharing in a group

Fairness dilemmas arise when groups are faced with making decisions about how to share their resources, rewards, or payoffs. Since resources are limited, groups need to decide on fair ways of apportioning them out to their members. These fairness judgments are determined by procedural and distributive forms of social justice. When payouts do not occur according to these norms, conflicts arise.

== Procedural justice ==
Procedural justice deals with the methods used in making the decisions about the allocation of the group's resources. Issues arise in this area when groups do not stick to their agreed upon methods for spreading out these resources. Conflicts will arise when the methods used are not consistent, open, or agreed upon by the group. The question asked by group members in this type of social justice is "did we make the decision in a fair way?"

== Distributive justice ==
Distributive justice deals with how rewards and costs are distributed across the members of the group. Issues might arise in this area when certain members are favored and consistently given premium rewards or apportioned more resources than other members. An analogy here is cutting up a cake into equal pieces, but someone feels that they have unjustly received a smaller piece. The question asked by group members in this type of social justice is "did I get my fair share?"

== Distributive norms ==
There are five types of distributive norms that help in maintaining distributive justice.

- Equity: this is where members' outcomes are based on their inputs to the group effort. Someone who has given more time, money, energy, risk, or other input, should receive more than someone who has contributed less.
- Equality: here, all group members receive an equal share of the profit, regardless of their amount of input.
- Power: the individuals with higher status, authority, or control receive more in this circumstance. This is akin to managers having a higher salary than lower ranking members of a team of researchers.
- Need: with this norm, people in the group with the greatest needs are provided with the necessary amount of resources required to meet those needs.
- Responsibility: essentially, this is where those who have more share with those who have less.

== Consequences of fairness dilemmas ==
The distribution of resources (most often money) is a very common cause of conflict in groups. Individuals tend to push for equality distribution norms when they have not contributed as much to the group. Smaller groups also tend to adopt equality norms, as do women. On the other hand, larger groups, as well as groups that significantly depend on one person's specialized input, prefer equitable distributions for the group. Negative inequity is experienced by group members who feel that they are not receiving fair payment for what they have contributed. This often results in lower quality of work, a reduction in effort (perhaps caused by the sucker effect), or complete withdrawal from the group. In contrast, positive inequality is experienced when members receive too much for the amount of effort they've put forth. This can lead to the individual increasing their efforts to actually deserve what they are receiving, but more often it leads to conflict in the group. Individuals tend to be motivated to maximize their personal rewards, so when they feel they are getting less than they deserve, they react negatively. On the flip side, when members feel like they are being rewarded for their input to the group, and they feel that the group is fairly allocating these rewards, they feel esteemed and proud. Members see a motive for group mates to give less rewards, while being less likely to believe they could be over-rewarded. The reaction in the former instance is shaped more by distributive justice, whereas the latter reaction is shaped more by procedural justice.

== See also ==
- Dilemma
- Social dilemma
