= Ringelmann effect =

Psychological effect which occurs in groups

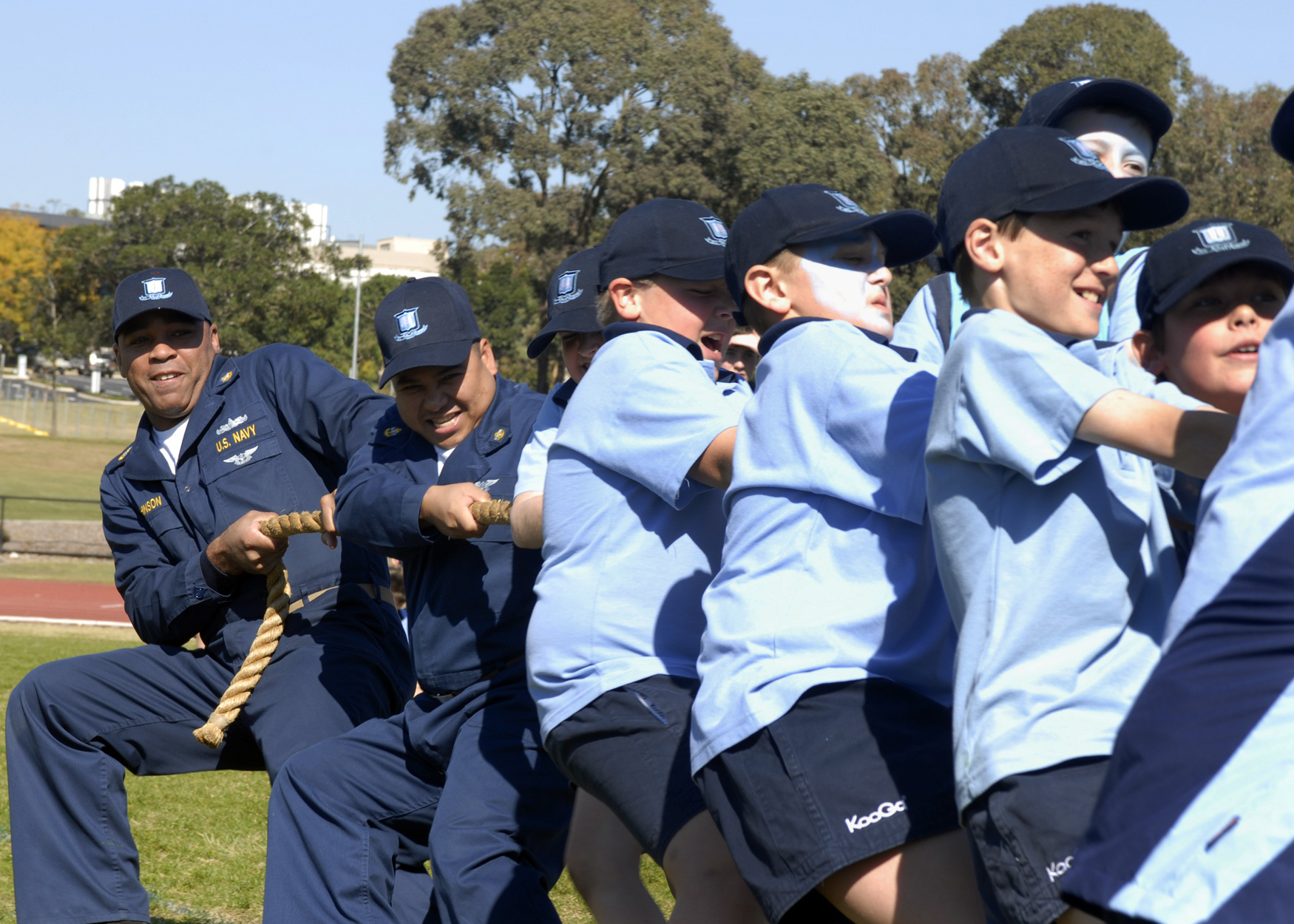
A tug of war is often used as an illustration of the Ringelmann effect. As more people are involved in a task, their average performance decreases, each participant tending to feel that their own effort is not critical.

The Ringelmann effect is the tendency for individual members of a group to become increasingly less productive as the size of their group increases. This effect, discovered by French agricultural engineer Maximilien Ringelmann (1861–1931), illustrates the inverse relationship that exists between the size of a group and the magnitude of group members’ individual contribution to the completion of a task.

While studying the relationship between process loss (i.e., reductions in performance effectiveness or efficiency) and group productivity, Ringelmann (1913) found that having group members work together on a task (e.g., pulling a rope) actually results in significantly less effort than when individual members are acting alone. Ringelmann discovered that as more and more people are added to a group, the group often becomes increasingly inefficient, ultimately violating the notion that group effort and team participation reliably leads to increased effort on behalf of the members.

== Causes ==
According to Ringelmann (1913), groups fail to reach their full potential because various interpersonal processes detract from the group’s overall proficiency. Namely, two distinct processes have been identified as potential sources for the reduced productivity of groups: loss of motivation, and coordination problems.

=== Loss of motivation ===
Motivation loss, or social loafing as it is otherwise known, is the reduction of exerted individual effort observed when people work in groups compared to when they work alone (Williams, Harkin, & Latané, 1981). According to Ringelmann (1913), group members tend to rely on their co-workers or co-members to furnish the desired effort required for a communal task. Although group members generally believe that they are contributing at maximum potential when asked, evidence has indicated that members exhibit loafing even when they are unaware that they are doing so (Karau & Williams, 1993). In order to reduce the level of social loafing in a group, several “solutions” have appeared in the literature on social facilitation. A selection of these solutions is as follows:

- Increase identifiability: When people feel as though their individual ideas or outputs are identifiable (e.g., subject to evaluation), they are motivated to exert greater effort towards a group task (Harkins & Jackson, 1985). This is because people become concerned about being evaluated by others (evaluation apprehension) when a task is simple and individualistic, in turn increasing productivity through social facilitation. By the same token, should a task allow group members to be anonymous (that is, stay in the background of group interactions and contribute in non-salient ways), they feel less pressure about being evaluated by others, leading to social loafing and reduced productivity on the group task (Forsyth, 2006).
- Minimize free-riding: Individuals who exhibit social loafing typically fail to contribute to standard because they believe others will make up for their slack. Therefore, individual members should be made to feel like they are an indispensable asset of the group. By increasing the perceived importance of their personal roles within the group, members tend to work harder towards achieving group goals (Kerr & Bruun, 1983). A similar effect can also be achieved by reducing the size of the group, because as group size shrinks, the role of each member in that group becomes increasingly integral, so there is less opportunity to loaf (Forsyth, 2006).
- Set goals: According to Harkins & Szymanski (1989), groups that establish clear, explicit goals tend to outperform groups that have lost sight of their objectives. Setting unambiguous goals is believed to stimulate an array of production-enhancing processes, including increased commitment to the group, thorough planning and quality-monitoring of group work, and improved effort exertion (Weldon, Jehn, & Pradhan, 1991). Aside from clarity, it is important that group goals be challenging. This is because easy tasks do not necessitate a group to complete them and thus provide an opportunity for members to loaf, whereas reaching challenging goals requires full collaboration from all groups members (Forsyth, 2006). For example, a group is unnecessary to answer the question “what is 2+2”, and if a group were created to do this, only one member would have to work. In contrast, a group might be necessary to complete integral mathematics assignments, because this goal is obviously more challenging and requires input from all members (Forsyth, 2006).
- Increase involvement: Another option to reduce social loafing is to simply increase how involved group members are with the task or goal at hand. This can be achieved by turning the task into a friendly competition between group members, or attach rewards or punishment to the task, contingent on the performance of the group as a whole (Forsyth, 2006). In a similar vein, loafing can also be prevented by convincing individual group members that the goal at hand is important, but that their colleagues are unmotivated to reach this goal, in a process called social compensation (Forsyth, 2006).

=== Loss of coordination ===
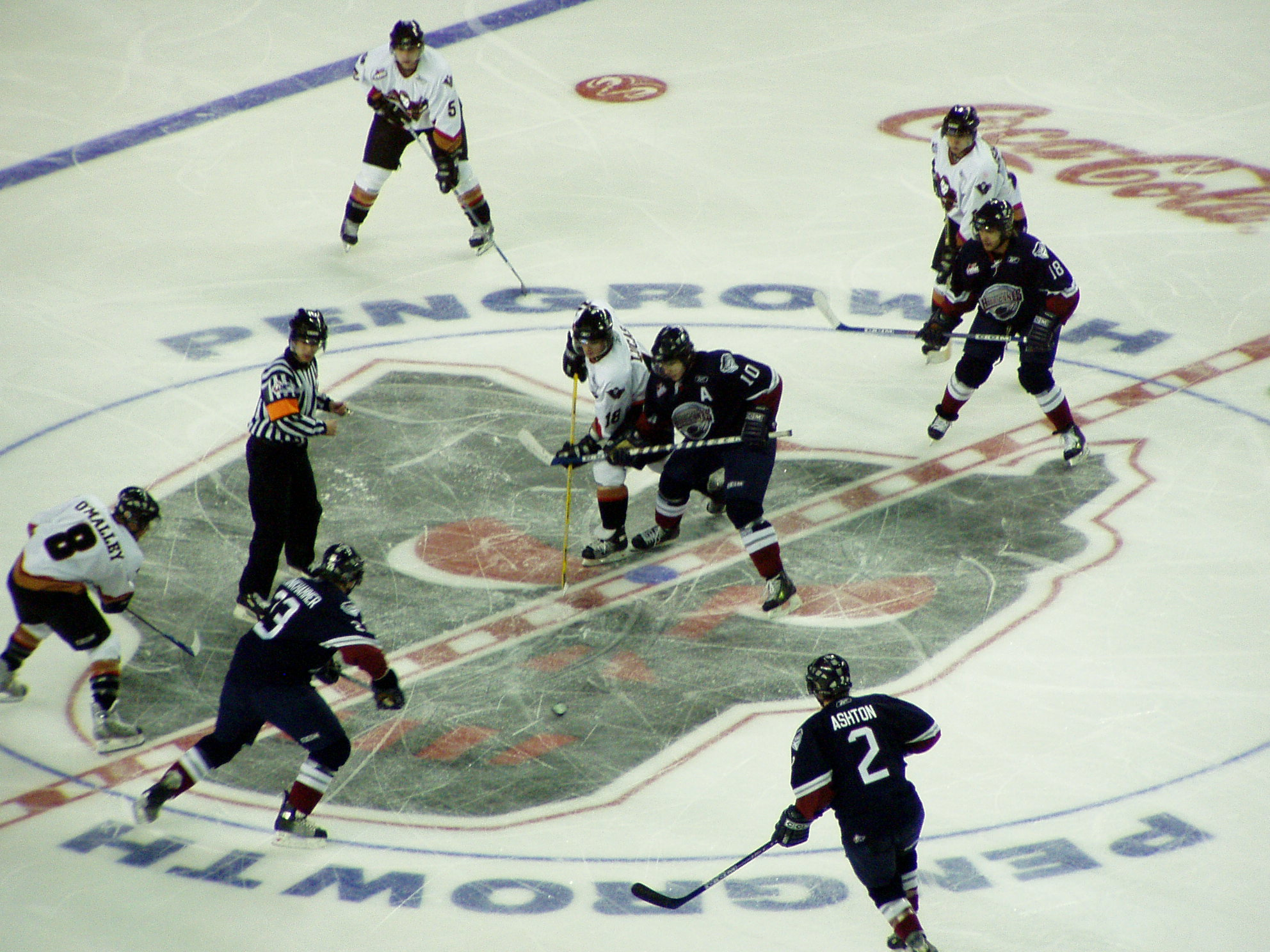
Ice hockey is an example of an activity where coordination is critical for efficient performance.

When individuals come together in groups to perform a task, their performance depends on their individual resources (e.g., talents, skills, effort) and the various interpersonal processes at work within the group. Even if group members possess the abilities and expertise required to complete an assigned task, they may fail to coordinate their efforts in a productive way. For example, hockey fans may feel that a particular team has the best chances of winning simply because the team is composed of all-star players. However, in reality, if the members of the team are not able to effectively synchronize their actions during game play, the team’s overall performance will likely suffer. According to Steiner (1972), coordination problems between group members are a function of the demands of the tasks to be performed. If a task is unitary (i.e., cannot be broken into subtasks for individual members), requires output maximization to be successful (i.e., a high rate of production quantity), and requires interdependence among members to yield a group product, the potential performance of a group relies on members’ abilities to coordinate with one another.

== Empirical support ==
Subsequent research has aided the further development of the Ringelmann effect theory. Most notably, Ingham, Levinger, Graves, and Peckham (1974) discovered that group members continue to exhibit reductions in rope-pulling force even after being placed in pseudo-groups (i.e., groups composed of confederates and one, true participant). In their study, Ingham et al. (1974) directed confederates to pretend to pull on a rope by faking exertion, suggesting to the real participant that all members were working together. What proves of interest here is that because there was virtually no coordination between the participant and the confederates (they were not physically taking part in the actions), poor communication cannot account for the decrease in effort. Therefore, Ingham et al. (1974) support the assertion that motivational losses largely determine an individual’s decline in performance when acting as a member of a group.

In addition, research has shown that participants who have previous experience in a team sport may not show the Ringelmann effect.

== Anti-Ringelmann effect in ant examples ==
There have been several apparent counter examples to the Ringelmann effect coming from ants. Early studies of this anti-Ringelmann effect in Eciton burchellii, a species of New World army ants, referred to the phenomenon as "superefficiency." In that case, army ant teams could cooperatively transport loads so large that if they were cut into equally sized pieces to distribute to individuals, the individuals could not carry them. More recently Weaver ants (Oecophylla smaragdina) were also shown to demonstrate such superefficiency but in the different context of teams collectively forming pulling chains. Ants taking part in these chains divide into active pullers and passive resisters that let them work as a team "force ratchet". The active pullers generate a pulling force that then get stored in chains of passive resisters. This lets them exploit the frictional strength of weaver ant attachment organs. The effect of this is to double average force of each individual ant so that larger groups can exert greater strength than their individual efforts.

== See also ==
- Bystander effect – Social psychological theory
- Diffusion of responsibility – Sociopsychological phenomenon
- Social facilitation – Effect of social factors on behavior
- Social loafing – Psychological effect which occurs in groups
- Dunbar's number – Suggested cognitive limit important in sociology and anthropology
- Diminishing returns – Economic theory
