= Team error =

Type of error

Team Error refers to errors that occur in settings where multiple people are working together. Dependency increases the likelihood of human error due to interactions with other seemingly independent defense mechanisms. Engaging multiple people to perform a task does not ensure that the task will be done correctly. One potential dependency is team error, an error of one or more members that allows other individual members of the same group to make a mistake.

== Common Types Of Team Errors ==
- Halo Effect – Immediate judgment discrepancy or cognitive bias, where a person making an initial assessment will assume the validity of ambiguous information based upon concrete information: blind trust in the competence of specific individuals because of their experience or education.
- Pilot/Copilot – Reluctance of a subordinate to challenge the opinions, decisions, or actions of a superior.
- Free Riding – Tendency to “tag along” without actively scrutinizing the intent and actions of another worker.
- Groupthink – When the desire for harmony or conformity in the group results in a dysfunctional outcome. While cohesiveness, loyalty and consensus are worthy attributes, groupthink can result when dissenting opinions are discouraged.
- Diffusion of responsibility – Sociopsychological phenomenon whereby each person in a group is less likely to take responsibility when others are present. It often causes a shift towards greater risk in decision-making and problem resolution, if two or more people agree together that they know a better way to do something.
- Errors Of Omission happen when a team member is supposed to coordinate with another member but does not even try.

== Examples ==
=== Pilot/copilot error ===
Air Florida Flight 90 at Washington’s National Airport in January 1982 had not been properly de-iced. Snow accumulated on the leading edges of the wings as the flight crew prepared for takeoff. During the after-start checklist procedure, the co-captain called out “engine anti-ice system". The captain reported, “engine anti-ice system off,” and then failed to turn it on. The system should have been on. Consequently, ice interfered with the engine pressure ratio (EPR) system, the primary indication of engine thrust. The copilot called the captain’s attention to the anomalous engine indications at least five times in the last moments before the plane rotated off the runway, but he did not oppose the captain’s decision to continue takeoff. Given the engine indications, he should have insisted on aborting the takeoff. The plane crashed, killing 74 of the 79 people on board.

=== Diffusion of responsibility error ===
At a US Department of Energy production facility in the late 1980s, the shift manager in the operating contractor organization, along with a small group of shift supervisors, planned and carried out the replacement of a faulty pump. Following the work control system had not been successful. The supervisory group reasoned that continued reliance on that system would not be successful. Schedule pressures and frustration led the men to take matters into their own hands and do the work themselves. The team violated procedures governing the work control system, quality inspections, worker certification and union labor rules governing work assignments and responsibilities. No single salaried supervisor would otherwise have considered doing a union mechanic’s job. In the group situation, the rules were discounted.

=== Halo Effect ===
Enron was an American energy company based in Houston, Texas in 2001. It was revealed that the company had been engaging in accounting fraud. Enron had been hiding billions of dollars in debt via various accounting loopholes, the company's shareholders filed a $40 billion lawsuit. The downfall of Enron was due to a lack of ethical leadership and coordination. Leaders were concerned with promoting a win at any cost culture through systems such as “rank and yank” by encouraging employees to achieve short-term goals at any cost. The culture at Enron caused high pressures to meet sales goals which inevitably impacted the employees’ ethical decision-making. Enron shareholders lost $74 billion leading up to its bankruptcy, its employees lost their jobs and their pensions.

=== Medical Error ===
Medical error can occur when there is poor coordination and communication amongst doctors and nurses, organizational practices that are out of date, and a cultural norm that suggests protecting oneself rather than protecting patients. Reducing this would need healthcare workers to communicate more effectively and would require training to acquire the same knowledge and understanding as other doctors and nurses to prevent errors from happening in the medical world. This would include healthcare professionals in all degrees including military medical personnel, general health, and specialized health.

=== Fire Fighting ===
Team error within firefighters is extremely dangerous. Not only is it a risk to the public if there is team error amongst firefighters, but it’s also a risk for themselves. A miscommunication or a failure to relay information could be detrimental to all involved. For example, failure to communicate where the fire is located could lead to groups of firefighters walking right into the fire, or into a place where they become trapped. If there were occupants in the burning building, firefighters would then have a harder job of rescuing them because they would also be focused on rescuing the firefighters that are trapped. After many accidents and fallout of communication, fire departments have included tips on how to avoid team error and even how to recognize it and swiftly put a stop to it.

== Strategies tend to reduce the occurrence of team errors ==
The following strategies were proposed by the DOE Human Performance Improvement Handbook.

- Maintain freedom of thought from other team members.
- Challenge actions and decisions of others to uncover underlying assumptions.
- Train people on team errors, their causes and interventions.
- Participate in formal team-development training.
- Practice questioning attitude/situational awareness on the job and during training.
- Designate a devil's advocate for problem-solving situations.
- Call “timeouts” to help the team achieve a shared understanding of plant or product status.
- Perform a thorough and independent task preview before the pre-job briefing.
- Establishing a strong leader with a clear vision and goals that established a structure
- Assign tasks strategically based on team member strengths
- Increase team familiarity to allow improved coordination, trust
- Actively sharing knowledge during team meetings
- Reward group success

== See also ==
- Human error
- Human reliability
- Latent human error
- Halo Effect
- Pilot error
- Groupthink
- Diffusion of responsibility
- Cascading failure
