= Social compensation =

Social compensation is considered the complement of social loafing, and refers to when individuals work harder and expend more effort in a group setting —to compensate for other group members—compared to when working alone. Social compensation is consistent with the expectancy-value formulations of effort theory. Williams and Karau first documented the social compensation hypothesis. The social compensation hypothesis states that there are two factors under which social compensation may occur: the expectation that other group members will perform insufficiently and if the group product is important to the individual. More specifically, the hypothesis states that if a group member is perceived to perform insufficiently either due to trust, reliability, or direct knowledge, or if an individual perceives a task or product as personally meaningful, then an individual may contribute more towards the collective product in order to avoid an inadequate performance. Social loafing is considered the complement of social compensation.

== Williams and Karau's research ==
Williams and Karau conducted three experiments addressing both social loafing and social compensation, with the first experiment focused on trust. Participants were pretested on interpersonal trust using Rotter's Interpersonal trust scale then completed a generation task in which participants were to come up with as many uses for a pair of scissors as possible. Each possible use was then written on a slip of paper and placed in the appropriate box. If a participant was part of the coactive condition, then slips of paper were placed in a box to their side and if a participant was part of the collective condition, slips of paper were placed in a common box in the middle. The results of this experiment indicated that levels of trust predict if social compensation or social loafing will occur. Those with low trust showed greater productivity when working collectively rather than alone, unlike those with medium or high trust who demonstrated social loafing.

The second experiment was necessary to manipulate expectations of coworker's productivity to rule out individual differences as a factor. The generation task employed is a modification of the first experiment. Unlike the first experiment, the participants were told that the task was related to intelligence to ensure that the task was perceived as meaningful. This was a two-by-two experiment in which coworker effort, either high or low, was crossed with work condition, group or individual; and the results showed support for the social compensation hypothesis. Coworker effort was manipulated using a confederate. When the experimenter momentarily left the room to retrieve a "forgotten stopwatch," a confederate said to the other participants that he thought the experiment was interesting, and that he was either going to work hard on the task or was not planning on working hard based on condition. Participants were willing to compensate for an underperforming coworker to avoid a negative group product due to perceived personal significance.

The purpose of the final experiment was to test whether personal significance increases likelihood of social compensation and if perceived coworker's lack of ability, rather than lack of motivation, can lead to social compensation. This expanded the study one step further with a two-by-two-by-two design: Personal significance, high or low; work condition, alone or group; and coworker ability, low or high. The procedure of this experiment nearly matches that of the second, much like the procedure of the second nearly matches that of the first. In the first meaningfulness condition, a female undergraduate displaying an unprofessional demeanor, conducted the experiment. She informed the participants that she was conducting the experiment due to an "incomplete" earned in a class, and did not conduct the experiment seriously, demonstrating low meaning. In the second, the experimenter was a male graduate who appeared to be highly involved. In this situation, the participants were also told that the task relates to intelligence and is of the utmost importance. Coworker ability was manipulated using a confederate. As in the second experiment, the experimenter "forgot the stopwatch" and momentarily left the room. During this time a confederate either confessed to the other participants that he was not especially skilled or was skilled at tasks such as the given generation task. The results showed support for the social compensation hypothesis. In addition, it was found that social compensation is limited to tasks that have personal significance and that social compensation may occur due to different attributions than lack of motivation such as inability.

== Social compensation and stereotypes ==
Plaks and Higgins examined how stereotypes play a role in social compensation. Specifically, they examined if, when deciding how much effort they should expend on the group task, people will incorporate stereotypical attributes of group members when explicit knowledge is not available. This research is applicable because it is common for individuals to lack previous experience working with, or lack information about, their fellow group members(e.g., juries). Thus, individuals may revert to using stereotypes to determine others', and thus their, level of group effort. Participants worked harder and expended greater effort (i.e., social compensation) when they believed their partner belonged to a group that was stereotypically ineffective at the task given (i.e., a poor partner-situation fit). Conversely, participants did not work as hard and expended less effort (i.e., social loafing) when they believed that their partner belonged to a group that was stereotypically effective at the task given (i.e., good partner-situation fit).

== Applications ==
=== Online dating ===
The social compensation hypothesis has been applied to research in online dating. In a study by Poley and Luo, the social compensation hypothesis, stating that people high in dating or social anxiety and low in social competence, tend to use online dating to compensate for social deficits, was not supported. Participants high in dating or social anxiety demonstrated greater use of and preferred face-to-face dating rather than online dating, and socially competent individuals perceived less benefit and expressed less interest in online dating. This indicates that individuals did not attempt to compensate for anxiety or social skills with online dating. However, a more recent study by Kuss and Griffeth found that social networking sites are often used by introverts for social compensation and learning while extraverts use social networking sites for social enhancement.

=== Online social enhancement ===
Research has also been applied to enhancing one's social popularity online. In a study by Zywica and Danowski, the social compensation hypothesis was supported. First, it was found that introverted participants exhibited lower self-esteem than extroverted participants. Facebook users with low self-esteem revealed more personal information online, shared information with Internet friends than real-life friends, expressed more of their personal facets online, exaggerated information, and admitted to having done something to look popular on Facebook. However, it is unclear whether this social compensation was due to enhancing popularity or feeling more comfortable expressing oneself online.
