= Diffusion of responsibility =

Sociopsychological phenomenon

Diffusion of responsibility is a sociopsychological phenomenon whereby a person is less likely to take responsibility for action or inaction when other bystanders or witnesses are present. Considered a form of attribution, the individual assumes that others either are responsible for taking action or have already done so.

The diffusion of responsibility refers to the decreased responsibility of action each member of a group feels when they are part of a group. For example, in emergency situations, individuals feel less responsibility to respond or call for help, if they know that there are others also watching the situation – if they know they are a part of the group of witnesses. In other group settings (in which a group is appointed to complete a task or reach a certain goal), the diffusion of responsibility manifests itself as the decreased responsibility each member feels to contribute and work hard towards accomplishing the task or goal. The diffusion of responsibility is present in almost all groups, but to varying degrees, and can be mitigated by reducing group size, defining clear expectations, and increasing accountability.

Assumption of responsibility tends to decrease when the potential helping group is larger, resulting in little aiding behavior demonstrated by the bystander(s). Causes range from psychological effects of anonymity to differences in sex. Implication of behaviours related to diffusion of responsibility can be threatening as there have been increases in moral disengagement and helping behaviour.

Diffusion of responsibility can be formalized using game theory as a free-rider problem or as a volunteer's dilemma using a coordination game.

== Real-world examples ==
In many real-world examples, it can be difficult to say with complete certainty that certain events happened or happen because of a sociopsychological effect such as diffusion of responsibility, the reasons being that in these events, there are many other contributing factors. Many of these events have also been traumatizing for the individuals who have recounted them. In situations which are known to increase anxiety, events have been found to be interpreted more dangerously or inaccurately than they appear. While accurate representation of events may be questionable, there have been extensive analyses on the following events regarding diffusion of responsibility and applications of its concept.

=== World War II ===
The diffusion of responsibility for alleged war crimes during World War II was famously used as a legal defense by many of the Nazis being tried at Nuremberg. A similar defense was mounted by the defendants accused in the My Lai massacre. Because of the displacement of responsibility, they did not feel the personal responsibility to help or at least not harm victims, but they felt like they were just following orders, and they did not feel responsible or guilty for their own actions. They blamed those telling them to carry out the orders rather than blaming themselves for the atrocities they had committed. The diffusion of responsibility is a probable cause for many of their feelings and actions, but other possible contributing factors include the existing antisemitism of Germany at that time and the threats imposed by Nazi officials.

=== Workplace ===
Diffusion of responsibility can be seen in the workplace through the response to mass email when compared to many, individualized emails. When mass emails are sent out, people feel a lack of accountability because the emails have not been addressed to them personally. Studies have shown that replies to personally addressed emails are more helpful and lengthier than replies to mass emails because personal interactions are associated with a greater sense of responsibility. For example, the author of reports having sent thousands of emails to professors at universities worldwide, inviting them to recommend a journal to their students, but receiving very few responses (less than 0.1%).

Another example of diffusion of responsibility revolves around whistleblowing in the work place. Many people employed by companies that regularly committed accounting fraud do not blow the whistle. This is due to lack of individual accountability and moral disengagement. It has been shown that many people often get so focused on their individual tasks, they forget to think about moral responsibilities in an organization. Thus whistleblowing may not even be considered. Moreover, in companies where it is promoted, people still do not participate since they assume others will take the responsibility, causing feelings similar to a lack of accountability.

=== Self-driving cars ===
Semi-autonomous cars require a human driver to be attentive at all times, and intervene if necessary. One safety concern is that humans are less likely to maintain attention if the automated system has partial responsibility for driving.

== Causes ==
Diffusion of responsibility occurs in large group settings and under both prosocial and antisocial conditions. In prosocial situations, individuals' willingness to intervene or assist someone in need is inhibited by the presence of other people. The individual is under the belief that other people present will or should intervene. Thus, the individual does not perceive it as her or his responsibility to take action. This will not happen if the individual believes that they are the only one aware of the situation. If a bystander is deciding how to help, they may abstain from doing so if they believe that they lack the competence to be of aid. Individuals may become reluctant to provide help for fear of how observers will view them.

=== Anonymity ===
In addition, diffusion of responsibility is more likely to occur under conditions of anonymity. In prosocial situations, individuals are less likely to intervene when they do not know the victim personally. Instead, they believe that someone who has a relationship with the victim will assist. In antisocial situations, negative behaviours are more likely to be carried out when the person is in a group of similarly motivated individuals. The behaviour is driven by the deindividuating effects of group membership and the diffusion of feelings of personal responsibility for the consequences. As part of this process, individuals become less self-aware and feel an increased sense of anonymity. As a result, they are less likely to feel responsible for any antisocial behaviour performed by their group. Diffusion of responsibility is also a causal factor governing much crowd behaviour, as well as risk-taking in groups.

Contrary to anonymity, it has been shown that if one can utilise technology to prevent anonymity, it can further prevent diffusion of responsibility. Studies have shown that if emails are sent directly to individuals as opposed to addressing individuals in mass emails, they can prevent diffusion of responsibility and elicit more responses. In addition to eliciting more responses, the responses that were received from individuals, as opposed to groups, were longer and more helpful to the initial questions asked.

=== Division of labor ===
Diffusion of responsibility can manifest itself in the workplace when tasks are assigned to individuals in terms of division of labor. In an economics context, diffusion of responsibility can be observed in groups when a leader assigns tasks to individuals. To promote the concept of fairness, the leader will generally assign an equal amount of work to individuals within the group. This is in part due to the idea that people in general want to seem fair and kind.

According to Albert Bandura, diffusion of responsibility can occur when managers create subtasks in an organization. When people are subdivided into individual tasks they can often forget their role to the organization as a whole and get narrow minded into focusing on their own role. Individuals may unknowingly diffuse their responsibility to an organization by only doing what is required of them in their respective tasks. This is because their focus for accountability is diverted from the organization to their individualized tasks.

=== Expertise ===
In organisations, diffusion of responsibility can be observed on the basis of roles and differing levels of expertise. For instance, in a hierarchical structure, where your position in the organisation is associated with your level of engagement to the group, people tend to diffuse accountability to those with greater responsibility and a higher level in the structure. Evidence from numerous research studies suggests "followers" have not taken responsibility because they feel they have a lower status in the organisation. Many individuals in a group assume those with a greater level of power are held accountable for more and assume they take on a greater level of responsibility. The association of level of expertise or role and the amount of work required can cause people to feel varying levels of responsibility and accountability for their own contributions.

=== Group size ===
Because of the diffusion of responsibility, people feel that their need to intervene in a situation decreases as the number of other (perceived) witnesses increases. In an experiment that John Darley and Bibb Latané conducted in 1968, it was found that a subject was much less likely to help someone having a seizure when the subject thought that at least one other subject was also hearing the individual have a seizure. The subject's likeliness to help decreased with the number of other subjects (up to four) he or she thought were also listening to the seizure. Group size is a key factor to the diffusion of responsibility, as in a different study, it was additionally found that the probability of an individual volunteering to be a primary helper or leader also decreases as the size of the group grows.

=== Gender ===
Research in the past has shown that gender does play a role in terms of how people make decisions about helping others. With regards to social responsibility of helping others in need, people feel less inclined to help those who they think need it less. Based on previous research, people have generally helped women and diffusion of responsibility is more prevalent when males have needed help because the general stereotype was that men don't need help and can handle situations on their own, whereas women were perceived as weaker than men. New research has shown that with changing viewpoints on gender stereotypes, diffusion of responsibility is less prevalent when a lone woman is in need of assistance due to the women's liberation movement, which has helped change those stereotypes.

== Consequences ==
=== Groupthink ===
Groupthink occurs when each of the individuals composing a group desires and cares more about reaching consensus and total agreement than critically examining, understanding, and utilising information.

Engaging in groupthink seeks to avoid any possible conflict or disagreement when making any decisions or actions, preferring compromises that may not be thought through to well-thought out arguments that do not receive unanimous approval from the group. Thus, groupthink cannot lead to the best decisions or solutions. Groupthink occurs when the group members are familiar with each other and seek each other's approval, especially in stressful situations. The diffusion of responsibility contributes to groupthink as when the diffusion of responsibility is occurring within a group, each group member feels less of a responsibility to express his or her own opinions or ideas, which leads to groupthink. Thus, when diffusion of responsibility occurs within groups, groupthink is also much more likely to occur.

=== Social loafing ===
Social loafing is the tendency for individuals to expend less effort when working collectively than when working individually. Social impact theory considers the extent to which individuals can be viewed as either sources or targets of social influence. When individuals work collectively, the demands of an outside source of social influence (e.g., an experimenter or one's boss) are diffused across multiple targets (i.e., diffusion of responsibility across all of the group members), leading to decreased levels of effort. On individual tasks, no such diffusion takes place, and individuals work hard, as there is no diffusion of responsibility. The division of social influence is thought to be a function of the strength, immediacy, and number of sources and targets present, and is predicted to follow an inverse power function specifying that each additional group member will have less influence as group size increases. Diffusion of responsibility is a direct cause of social loafing, as when diffusion of responsibility is occurring within a group, group members do not feel as responsible for their actions (or lack of action) and are much more likely to engage in social loafing.

=== Helping behavior ===
Social psychological experiments have demonstrated that individuals' failure to assist others in emergencies is not due to apathy or indifference, but rather to the presence of other people. This is explained by both bystander effect and diffusion of responsibility. In 1968 and a series of experiments that followed, John Darley and Bibb Latané demonstrated that an individual's choice to help or intervene when there is an emergency depends on the number of bystanders. Group size significantly influenced the likelihood of helping behavior in a staged emergency: 85% of participants responded with intervention when alone, 62% of participants took action when with one other person, and only 31% did when there were four other bystanders. Other studies have replicated the phenomenon, including reports from real emergencies such as calling an ambulance for overdose patients and offering CPR after cardiac arrest.

In ambiguous situations, the individual's appraisal of the situation and subsequent action or inaction largely depends on the reactions of other people. Other bystanders' interpretation of an emergency influences perception of the incident and helping behavior. In one study, diffusion of responsibility does not occur if another bystander is perceived as being unable to help.

Group psychology can also influence behaviour positively; in the event that one bystander takes responsibility for the situation and takes specific action, other bystanders are more likely to follow course. This is a positive example of the usually-pejorative herd mentality. Thus, the presence of bystanders affects individual helping behaviour by processes of social influence and diffusion of responsibility.

=== Moral disengagement ===
Diffusion of responsibility can negatively affect personal morals. With diffusion of responsibility, it has been found that people feel less accountable for their work. This lack of accountability can be because labour is divided amongst members in a group and so no one member feels an overwhelming amount of responsibility for their organisation or their overall project. It has been found that many members get narrowed into focusing on their individual work, that they eventually forget about any moral aspects. Purely focusing on the functional aspects of their jobs is a result of division of labour, which is a mechanism for diffusion of responsibility. This can be highly concerning for organisations since division of labour is a common practice amongst many.

Moral disengagement is likely to be particularly important in organisations because bureaucratic structures and the division of labour seem to lend themselves to moral disengagement mechanisms such as the diffusion and displacement of responsibility. Euphemistic labelling is also common in organisations, such as when managers refer to layoffs as "rightsizing." Also, with victims out of sight, globalization makes it easier to ignore or distort the harmful consequences of business actions. Thus, moral disengagement seems highly relevant to understanding unethical behaviour in 21st century organizations.

=== Risk-taking behaviour ===
The risky-shift effect (see groupshift) is the increased likelihood for a group to support or partake in a risky decision or action. Larger groups permit a wider responsibility diffusion than the groups of two or three. As group size increases, the likelihood also increases that the group contains at least one highly risky and influential member who would be able to win over all the others. This demonstrates how larger group size and the increased riskiness of one person can cause the diffusion of responsibility from all group members to only the decisive, risk-taking member. From the group-processes standpoint, then, the risky-shift effect becomes stronger as the groups grow larger. And it has been proved by various studies that the risky-shift effect is more pronounced the larger the size of the group.

In risk-taking literature, diffusion of responsibility occurs when individual members of a group feel less personal responsibility for potential failure in the pursuit of risky options than if acting alone.

Such risky shift is a stable phenomenon that has been shown in experiments involving group discussion and consensus. For example, a study using risks and payoffs based on monetary gain and loss for problem-solving performance found a greater percentage of shift—hence, increased risk taking in group decision making.

Other research suggests that risky shifts can also be attributed to group polarization, majority rules, interpersonal comparisons, informational influence, and familiarisation. Like diffusion of responsibility in emergency situations, the larger the size of the group during conditions of discussion and information exchange, the greater the risky shift.

=== Bystander effect ===
Rising from the unfortunate case of Catherine "Kitty" Genovese, the bystander effect is a psychological notion that came to light in the 1960s. Catherine Genovese's case seems to cast a predominantly daunting light on human behavior. The event highlights the lessening of the likelihood of a person taking immediate action in a certain situation while part of a group or around other people.

Darley and Latané (1968) performed a study that viewed whether the presence of other bystanders would affect the likelihood and speed of which the subjects would respond to hearing another subject (a confederate) having a seizure. The subjects either believed they were in a two-person group, three-person group, or a six-person group. The researchers concluded that subjects were less likely to help the greater the number of bystanders, demonstrating the bystander effect.

The bystander effect is a specific type of diffusion of responsibility—when people's responses to certain situations depend on the presence of others. The bystander effect occurs when multiple individuals are watching a situation unfold but do not intervene (or delay or hesitate to intervene) because they know that someone else could intervene, and they feel less responsibility to do so. This is directly caused by the diffusion of responsibility, as it is shown that individuals are much less likely to intervene in a situation when he or she knows others are watching; thus, the responsibility for helping is spread among the group of bystanders, and each bystander does not feel a strong responsibility to do so, so no one helps.

However, it has been shown that people's responses and levels of aid can change depending on the type of situation (emergencies versus non-emergencies) as well.

== "Somebody else's problem" ==
"Somebody else's problem" (or "someone else's problem", sometimes abbreviated SEP) is a phrase for an issue that a person dismisses on the grounds that they consider someone else to be responsible for it.

A 1976 article in the journal Ekistics used the phrase in the context of bureaucratic inaction on low-income housing, describing "the principle of somebody else's problem" as an obstacle to progress: where responsibility for a complex problem is spread across many government departments, even agencies that want to tackle it are unable to do so. In 1997 Alan F. Blackwell wrote that programmers working on a software project could defer sub-goals until they became "what is known amongst professional programmers as an 'S.E.P.' – somebody else's problem".

Douglas Adams's 1982 novel Life, the Universe and Everything, part of The Hitchhiker's Guide to the Galaxy series, introduces a "Somebody Else's Problem field", a fictional cloaking device that relies on "people's natural predisposition not to see anything they don't want to, weren't expecting, or can't explain". A 2015 essay on invisibility in The New Yorker quoted Adams's description and compared it with the perception filter in Doctor Who and with inattentional blindness and change blindness.

== See also ==
- Abilene paradox
- Automation bias
- Banality of evil
- Buck passing
- Collective responsibility
- Crowd psychology
- Design by committee
- Little Eichmanns
- Milgram experiment
- NIMBY (not in my back yard)
- Nuremberg Defense
- Omission bias
- Responsibility assignment matrix
- Tragedy of the commons
- Team error
