= John M. Darley =

American social psychologist (1938–2018)

- Born: John McConnon Darley; April 3, 1938; Minneapolis, Minnesota, U.S.
- Died: August 31, 2018 (aged 80); Lawrenceville, New Jersey, U.S.
- Education: Swarthmore College (BA); Harvard University (PhD)
- Known for: Research on the bystander effect
- Awards: Fellow of the American Academy of Arts and Sciences since 2005, Distinguished Science Award from Society of Experimental Social Psychology (1997)
- Scientific career
- Fields: Psychology; Public affairs
- Workplaces: Princeton University
- Thesis: Fear and Social Comparison as Determinants of Conformity Behavior (1965)
- Doctoral advisor: David Marlowe
- Doctoral students: Michael Norton

John M. Darley (April 3, 1938 – August 31, 2018) was an American social psychologist and professor of psychology and public affairs at Princeton University. Darley is best known, in collaboration with Bibb Latané, for developing theories that aim to explain why people might not intervene (i.e. offer aid) at the scene of an emergency when others are present; this phenomenon is known as the bystander effect and the accompanying diffusion of responsibility effect. This work stemmed from the tragic case of Kitty Genovese, a New Yorker who was murdered in March 1964 while 38 people either witnessed or heard her struggling with the assailant. Darley also studied the effect of assessment on performance and proposed Darley's Law, which states that “The more any quantitative performance measure is used to determine an individual’s rewards, the more subject it will be to corruption pressures and the more it will distort the action and thought patterns of those it is intended to monitor.”

== Life and career ==
John M. Darley was born on April 3, 1938, in Minneapolis, Minnesota to father John G. “Jack” Darley, a counseling psychologist known for work in student personnel psychology, individual differences, and psychological testing. Darley followed his father's footsteps and received a bachelor's degree in psychology from Swarthmore College in 1960 and a PhD in Social Relations from Harvard University in 1965. While completing his dissertation, Darley worked as an assistant professor at New York University (NYU) between 1964 and 1968.

In 1968, Darley became an associate professor of psychology and public affairs at Princeton University, where he was promoted to full professor in 1972 and named the Dorman T. Warren Professor of Psychology in 1989. Darley, along with colleagues Joel Cooper and Edward E. Jones, built the strongest experimental social psychology program in the country. Darley was chair of the Princeton Department of Psychology from 1980 to 1985.

Darley also served as the president of the Society of Personality and Social Psychology in 1989, and president of the American Psychological Society in 2002.

During the last decade of his career, he also worked in the psychology department at the Princeton (formerly Woodrow Wilson) School of Public and International Affairs and retired from the Princeton faculty in 2012, accepting emeritus status.

Darley died August 31, 2018, survived by his widow, Genevieve Pere, former spouse Susan Darley, two daughters, and three grandchildren.

== Research ==
While in New York, Darley began the research that defined his career. After hearing of the tragic case of Kitty Genovese, he was inspired to explore why people are less likely to intervene when there are other witnesses present, a phenomenon is the “Bystander effect”. With collaborator, Bibb Latané from Columbia University, Darley developed and conducted experiments to explore the bystander effect and understand the circumstances that create it.

John M. Darley conducted extensive research on how individuals interpret social situations and make decisions about moral and prosocial behavior. His most influential early contribution was the study of bystander intervention conducted with Bibb Latané, which demonstrated that individuals are less likely to help in emergencies when they believe others are present. Darley and Latané argued that this reduction in helping occurs through diffusion of responsibility, in which people assume that someone else will act.

Darley later expanded this work through a multi-stage model of helping behavior, showing that individuals must first notice the situation, then interpret it as an emergency, and finally decide to take personal responsibility. He found that ambiguity, social comparison, and perceived expertise of other bystanders can significantly delay or inhibit intervention. This framework is now a core component of modern social psychology and is widely taught in introductory psychology courses.

Beyond helping behavior, Darley made major contributions to moral psychology. His research explored how people evaluate harmful actions versus omissions, how they disengage from moral responsibility, and how social structures shape ethical judgment. Darley proposed that moral failures often arise not from intentional wrongdoing but from cognitive and situational pressures that obscure responsibility. His work bridged laboratory research with applied fields including law, public policy, and organizational ethics.

From the mid-1970s to the mid-1980s Darley turned his attention to pioneering efforts aimed at applying psychology to engineering and energy conservation. He worked with colleagues on how behavioral ideas can be used in energy conservation to better the environment and economy.

At the end of his career, Darley's focus changed to the average person's conceptions of law and the legal system. This interest of his turned into his main line of research. Darley saw the current reformatory strategy used in prison system as a poor one, he wanted to develop a psychology based reform strategy.

== Peer-reviewed publications ==
Darley's top five articles, according to Google Scholar, include:

- Greene JD, Sommerville RB, Nystrom LE, Darley JM, Cohen JD. An fMRI investigation of emotional engagement in moral judgment. Science. 2001 Sep 14;293(5537):2105-2108.
- Darley, J. M., & Latane, B. (1968). Bystander intervention in emergencies: Diffusion of responsibility. Journal of Personality and Social Psychology, 8(4, Pt.1), 377–383.
- Greene JD, Nystrom LE, Engell AD, Darley JM, Cohen JD. The neural bases of cognitive conflict and control in moral judgment. Neuron. 2004 Oct 14;44(2):389-400.
- Darley, J. M., & Gross, P. H. (1983). A hypothesis-confirming bias in labeling effects. Journal of Personality and Social Psychology, 44(1), 20–33.
- Latane, B., & Darley, J. M. (1968). Group inhibition of bystander intervention in emergencies. Journal of Personality and Social Psychology, 10(3), 215–221.
