= Basic and Applied Social Psychology =

- Discipline: Social psychology
- Language: English
- Edited by: David Trafimow

Publication details
- History: 1980–present
- Publisher: Lawrence Erlbaum Associates (United States)
- Frequency: Bi-Monthly
- Impact factor: 1.577 (2019)

Standard abbreviations
- ISO 4: Basic Appl. Soc. Psychol.
- NLM: Basic Appl Soc Psych

Indexing
- ISSN: 0197-3533 (print); 1532-4834 (web)
- OCLC no.: 6006710

Links
- Journal homepage; Current issue

Basic and Applied Social Psychology (BASP) is a bi-monthly psychology journal published by Taylor & Francis. The journal emphasizes the publication of empirical research articles but also publishes literature reviews, criticism, and methodological or theoretical statements spanning the entire range of social psychological issues.

In 2015, the journal banned p-values (and related inferential statistics such as confidence intervals) as evidence in papers accepted by the journal, replacing hypothesis testing with "strong descriptive statistics, including effect sizes" on the grounds that "the state of the art [for hypothesis testing] remains uncertain".
