= Bibb Latané =

American social psychologist (born 1937)

Bibb Latané (/ˈlɑːtəneɪ/; born July 19, 1937) is an American social psychologist. He worked with John M. Darley on bystander intervention in emergencies. He has also published many articles on social attraction in animals, social loafing in groups, and the spread of social influence in populations.

== Biography ==
Latané received his B.A. from Yale in 1958 and his Ph.D. (under the mentorship of Stanley Schachter) from the University of Minnesota in 1963. He taught at Columbia University, the Ohio State University, Florida Atlantic University, and the University of North Carolina at Chapel Hill. In the 1980s, he was director of UNC's Institute for Research in Social Science (now the Odum Institute). He is currently director of the Center for Human Science in Chapel Hill, NC, which he founded.

Latané's work with Darley involved a series of experiments that staged emergencies so that the social psychologists could observe how the presence of inactive bystanders affect the subjects' helping behavior. Latané was also instrumental in introducing ideas from dynamical systems theory into social psychology, demonstrating, for example, how various forms of order could emerge spontaneously in large social groups from individual's simple attempts to fit in with their local neighbors. He also developed the social impact theory, which holds that social influence is a function of the strength (S), the immediacy (I), and number (N) of sources present, or Impact = "f(SIN)".

Together with Kipling Williams and Stephen Harkins, Latané introduced the term social loafing, a term that denotes people's tendency to slack off in groups due to the idea that one's personal contribution is unidentifiable. It is the opposite of social facilitation, which denotes arousal caused by the presence of others.

Latané was awarded the AAAS Prize for Behavioral Science Research twice, in 1968 and in 1980.
