= Group Dynamics: Theory, Research, and Practice =

- Discipline: Social psychology
- Language: English
- Edited by: David K. Marcus (Outgoing), Giorgio A. Tasca (Incoming)

Publication details
- History: 1997–present
- Publisher: American Psychological Association (USA)
- Frequency: Quarterly
- Impact factor: 0.759 (2020)

Standard abbreviations
- ISO 4: Group Dyn. Theory Res. Pract.

Indexing
- ISSN: 1089-2699 (print); 1930-7802 (web)

Links
- Journal homepage; Online access

Group Dynamics: Theory, Research, and Practice is a peer-reviewed academic journal published by Division 49 of the American Psychological Association. The journal was created in 1997 and includes research on group dynamics, defined by the editors as "the scientific study of all aspects of groups." The current editor-in-chief is David K. Marcus of Washington State University.

== Abstracting and indexing ==
According to the Journal Citation Reports, the journal has a 2020 impact factor of 0.759.
