= Journalism ethics and standards =

Principles of ethics and of good practice in journalism

Journalistic ethics and standards are principles of ethics and good practice applicable to journalists. This subset of media ethics is known as journalism's professional "code of ethics" and the "canons of journalism". The basic codes and canons commonly appear in statements by professional journalism associations and individual print, broadcast, and online news organizations.

There are around 400 codes covering journalistic work around the world. While various codes may differ in the detail of their content and come from different cultural traditions, most share common elements that reflect values including the principles of truthfulness, accuracy and fact-based communications, independence, objectivity, impartiality, fairness, respect for others and public accountability, as these apply to the gathering, editing and dissemination of newsworthy information to the public. Some such principles are sometimes in tension with non-Western and Indigenous ways of doing journalism.

Like many broader ethical systems, the journalism ethics include the principle of "limitation of harm". This may involve enhanced respect for vulnerable groups and the withholding of certain details from reports, such as the names of minor children, crime victims' names, or information not materially related to the news report where the release of such information might, for example, harm someone's reputation or put them at undue risk. There has also been discussion and debate within the journalism community regarding appropriate reporting of suicide and mental health, particularly with regard to verbiage.

Some journalistic codes of ethics, notably some European codes, also include a concern with discriminatory references in news based on race, religion, sexual orientation, and physical or mental disabilities. The Parliamentary Assembly of the Council of Europe approved (in 1993) Resolution 1003 on the Ethics of Journalism, which recommends that journalists respect the presumption of innocence, in particular in cases that are still sub judice.

== Evolution and purpose of codes of journalism ==
Despite modern journalism going back as far as 400 years ago, journalism became more of a necessity in some views in the 1900s. Newspapers function with the ideal of presenting "unbiased" information for the masses. The continual evolution of journalism, media and society as a whole, means that journalism will continue to face challenges in the pursuit of that ideal, and the unbiased presentation of information must be a constant topic in editorial meetings and in frequent discussions between editors and reporters.

Every country presents its own unique aspects and sometimes challenges as far the codes correlated with Journalism codes today. "Truth", "accuracy", and "objectivity" are cornerstones of journalism ethics. Journalists are encouraged to maintain a degree of detachment from the religions, groups, or countries they are associated with, in order to minimize potential biases in their reporting. Certain countries prefer to only have certain information put out and in certain contexts. In Islamic countries there is growing suspicion that journalism is fixed to only be positive for Islam, prompting Islam itself as the one and only truth its people should believe in.

== Codes of practice ==
While journalists in the United States and European countries have led the formulation and adoption of these standards, such codes can be found in news reporting organizations in most countries with freedom of the press. The written codes and practical standards vary somewhat from country to country and organization to organization, but there is substantial overlap between mainstream publications and societies. The International Federation of Journalists (IFJ) launched a global Ethical Journalism Initiative in 2008 aimed at strengthening awareness of these issues within professional bodies. In 2013 the Ethical Journalism Network was founded by former IFJ General Secretary Aidan White. This coalition of international and regional media associations and journalism support groups campaigns for ethics, good governance and self-regulation across all platforms of media. One of the leading voices in the U.S. for journalistic standards and ethics is the Society of Professional Journalists. The Preamble to its Code of Ethics states:

[P]ublic enlightenment is the forerunner of justice and the foundation of democracy. The duty of the journalist is to further those ends by seeking truth and providing a fair and comprehensive account of events and issues. Conscientious journalists from all media and specialties strive to serve the public with thoroughness and honesty. Professional integrity is the cornerstone of a journalist's credibility.

The Radio Television Journalism News Association, an organization exclusively centered on electronic journalism, has a code of ethics centering on public trust, truthfulness, fairness, integrity, independence, and accountability. Another view is offered by Jesse Hearns-Branaman, who describes the basis of journalistic professionalism as a combination of professional socialisation and the capability for self-criticism and scepticism while still following the idealised goals of journalism.

== Common elements ==
The primary themes common to most codes of journalistic standards and ethics are the following.

=== Accuracy and standards for factual reporting ===
- Reporters are expected to be as accurate as possible given the time allotted for story preparation and the space available, and to seek reliable sources. Properly using their sources and using accurate quoting and use of words from interview or conversation. Journalism today is built off true, accurate and objective information. To remove those aspects would be damaging to the very core of not just journalism but also the very way information is spread and given to viewers and others all around the world. The audience will see the lack of ethics and standards, making others question whether information is good and reliable information. The hierarchy of evidence indicates the reliability of sources for medical journalism and science journalism.
- Events with a single eyewitness are reported with attribution. Events with two or more independent eyewitnesses may be reported as fact. Controversial facts are reported with attribution.
- Independent fact-checking by another employee of the publisher is desirable. In 2018 "The Acton Plan" was created to help check information more effectively to hopefully get rid of false information.
- Corrections are published when errors are discovered. These corrections are called corrigendum in newspapers, they feature after on the next issue published.
- Defendants at trial are treated only as having "allegedly" committed crimes, until conviction, when their crimes are generally reported as fact (unless, that is, there is serious controversy about wrongful conviction). In most publications, when defendants are convicted or pleaded guilty they will replace "allegedly" with "convicted of", "pleaded guilty to", or "found guilty of" in their reporting to avoid the small chance of a defamation issue in the event of a wrongful conviction.
- Opinion surveys and statistical information deserve special treatment to communicate in precise terms any conclusions, to contextualize the results, and to specify accuracy, including estimated error and methodological criticism or flaws. Through this information can be properly analyzed and used without heavy bias.
- Quality journalism that scrutinizes and criticizes social, political and economic authority is in a constant state of vulnerability to manipulation and censorship.

=== Slander and libel considerations ===
- Reporting the truth is almost never libel, which makes accuracy very important.
- Private persons have privacy rights that must be balanced against the public interest in reporting information about them. Public figures have fewer privacy rights in U.S. law, where reporters are immune from a civil case if they have reported without malice. In Canada, there is no such immunity; reports on public figures must be backed by facts.
- Publishers have traditionally vigorously defend libel lawsuits filed against them. Truth is always a defense in libel. Courts in the U.S. generally do not rule in favor of the party claiming libel unless they can show that the journalist "published untrue information that hurt the reputation of an identifiable person," and that the journalist was "either negligent or reckless in failing to check the information."

=== Harm limitation principle ===
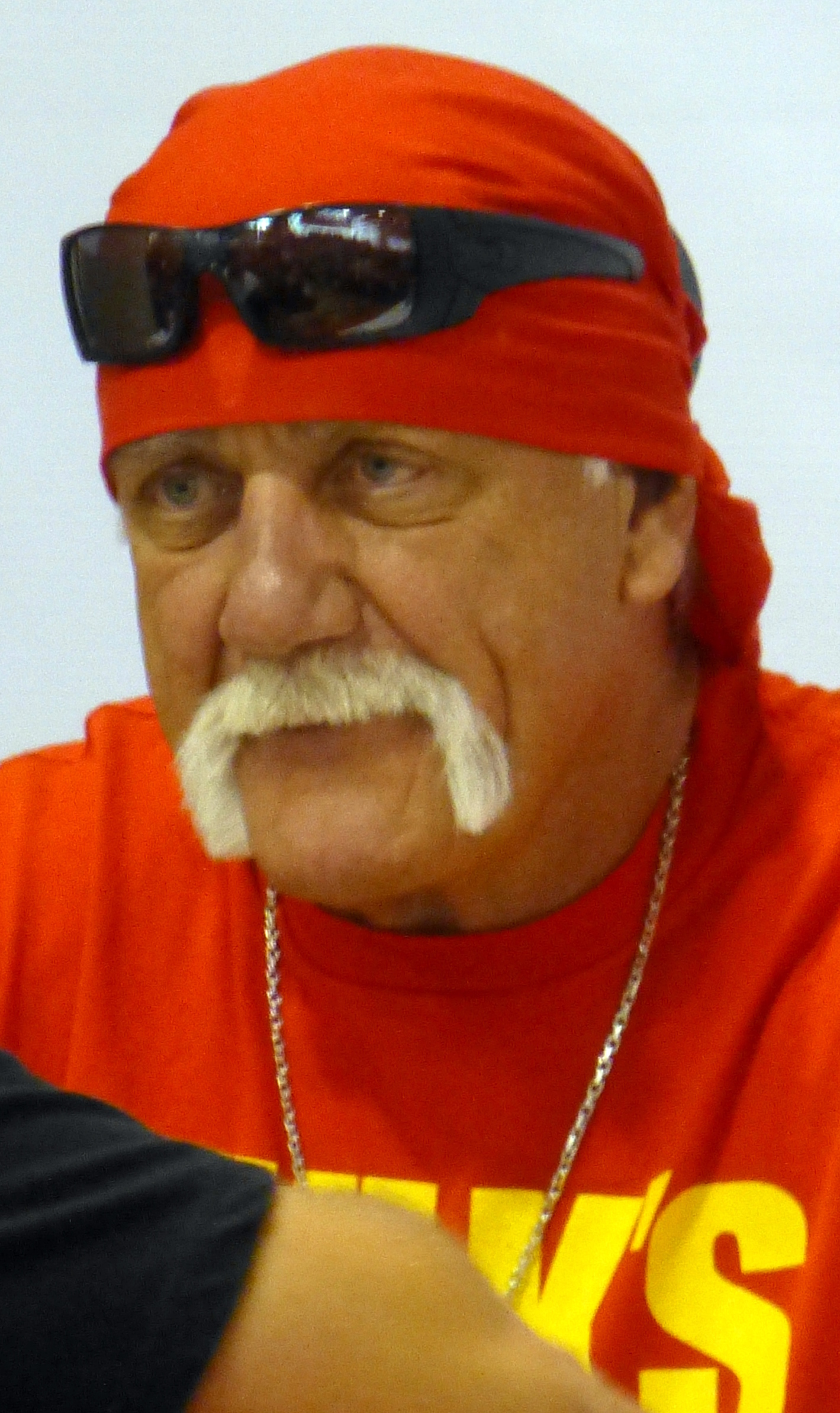
Professional wrestler Hulk Hogan drove Gawker Media to bankruptcy after he sued them for publishing portions of a sex tape of him.

During the normal course of an assignment a reporter might go about gathering facts and details, conducting interviews, doing research and background checks, taking photos, and recording video and sound in search of justice. Harm limitation deals with the questions of whether everything learned should be reported and, if so, how. This principle of limitation means that some weight needs to be given to the negative consequences of full disclosure, creating a practical and ethical dilemma. The Society of Professional Journalists' code of ethics offers the following advice, which is representative of the practical ideas of most professional journalists. Quoting directly:

- Show compassion for those who may be affected adversely by news coverage. Use special sensitivity when dealing with children and inexperienced sources or subjects.
- Be sensitive when seeking or using interviews or photographs of those affected by tragedy or grief.
- Recognise that gathering and reporting information may cause harm or discomfort. Pursuit of the news is not a license for arrogance.
- Recognise that private people have a greater right to control information about themselves than do public officials and others who seek power, influence or attention. Only an overriding public need can justify intrusion into anyone's privacy.
- Show good taste. Avoid pandering to lurid curiosity.
- Be cautious about identifying juvenile suspects or victims of sex crimes.
- Be judicious about naming criminal suspects before the formal filing of charges.
- Balance a criminal suspect's fair trial rights with the public's right to be informed.

== Regulation ==
In addition to codes of ethics, many news organizations maintain an in-house ombudsman whose role is, in part, to keep news organizations honest and accountable to the public. The ombudsman is intended to mediate in conflicts stemming from internal or external pressures, to maintain accountability to the public for news reported, to foster self-criticism, and to encourage adherence to both codified and uncodified ethics and standards. This position may be the same or similar to the public editor, though public editors also act as a liaison with readers and do not generally become members of the Organisation of News Ombudsmen. An alternative is a news council, an industry-wide self-regulation body, such as the Press Complaints Commission, set up by UK newspapers and magazines. Such a body is capable of applying fairly consistent standards and of dealing with a higher volume of complaints but may not escape criticisms of being toothless.

== Ethics and standards in practice ==
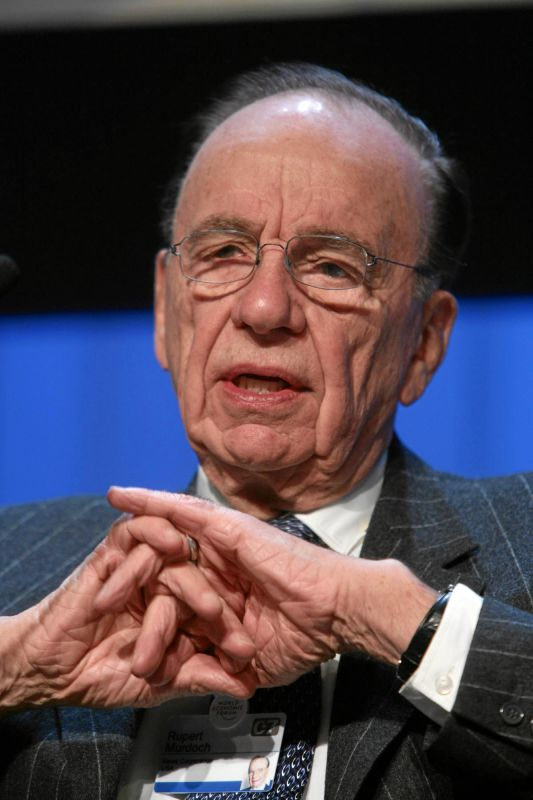
Rupert Murdoch resigned as News Corporation owner following the News International phone hacking scandal.

One of the most controversial issues in modern reporting is media bias, particularly with political issues, but also with regard to cultural and other issues. Another is the controversial issue of checkbook journalism, which is the practice of news reporters paying sources for their information. In the U.S., it is generally considered unethical to pay sources for information, with most mainstream newspapers and news shows having a policy forbidding it. Meanwhile, tabloid newspapers and tabloid television shows, which rely more on sensationalism, regularly engage in the practice.

There are also some wider concerns as the media continues to change that the brevity of news reports and use of soundbites has reduced fidelity to the truth, and may contribute to a lack of needed context for public understanding. From outside the profession, the rise of news management contributes to the real possibility that news media may be deliberately manipulated. Selective reporting (spiking and double standards) are very commonly alleged against newspapers.

=== Attempts to identify misinformation ===
The Action Plan proposed by the EU authorities is meant to propose a guide for identifying misinformation. The project seeks to target misinformation and produce unbiased and professional informational postings.

=== Genres, ethics, and standards ===
Advocacy journalists—a term of some debate even within the field of journalism—by definition tend to reject "objectivity", while at the same time maintaining many other common standards and ethics. Civic journalism adopts a modified approach to objectivity where instead of being uninvolved spectators, the press is active in facilitating and encouraging public debate and examining claims and issues critically. This does not necessarily imply advocacy of a specific political party or position.

Literary journalism use the power of language and literary devices more akin to fiction to bring insight and depth into the often book-length treatment of the subjects about which they write. Such devices as dialogue, metaphor, digression and other such techniques offer the reader insights not usually found in standard news reportage. However, authors in this branch of journalism still maintain ethical criteria such as factual and historical accuracy as found in standard news reporting. They venture outside the boundaries of standard news reporting in offering richly detailed accounts. One widely regarded author in the genre is Joyce Carol Oates, as with her book on boxer Mike Tyson.

Cosmopolitan journalism represents the cosmopolitanism imperative that the primary ethical allegiance is to a borderless moral community of humankind is often misunderstood. The claim of humanity is not the cognition of a cold abstract principle; rather, the 14 Global Journalism Ethics represent the ability to perceive and value our common humanity in the situations of life - respect for mankind's rational and moral capacities wherever and however, they are manifest. In our concrete dealings with others, we recognize humanity's common aspirations, vulnerabilities, and capacities, as well as its potential for suffering. In a fragmented world, cosmopolitanism focuses on what is fundamental—a common aspiration to life, liberty, justice, and goodness.

Investigative journalism often takes an implicit point of view on a particular public interest story by asking pointed questions and intensely probing certain questions. With outlets that otherwise strive for neutrality on political issues, the implied position in an investigative story is often uncontroversial—for example, that political corruption or abuse of children is wrong and perpetrators should be exposed and punished, that government money should be spent efficiently, or that the health of the public or workers or veterans should be protected. Advocacy journalists often use investigative journalism in support of a particular political position, or to expose facts that are only concerning to those with certain political opinions. Regardless of whether or not it is undertaken for a specific political faction, investigative journalism usually puts a strong emphasis on factual accuracy, because the point of an in-depth investigation of an issue is to expose facts that spur change. Not all investigations seek to expose facts about a particular problem. Some data-driven reporting provides a deep analysis and presents interesting results for the general edification of the audience, which might be interpreted in different ways or contain many facts across different potential problems. A factually-constrained investigation with an implied public-interest point of view may also find that the system under investigation is working well.

New Journalism and Gonzo journalism reject some of the fundamental ethical practices and abandon the technical standards of journalistic prose in order to write expressively and reach a particular audience or market segment. These favor a subjective perspective and emphasize immersive experiences over objective facts. Tabloid journalists are often accused of sacrificing accuracy and the personal privacy of their subjects in order to boost sales. The 2011 News International phone hacking scandal is an example of this. Supermarket tabloids are often focused on entertainment rather than news. Tabloid news often have "news" stories that are so outrageous that they are widely read for entertainment purposes, not for information. Some tabloids do purport to maintain common journalistic standards but may fall far short in practice. Others make no such claims. Some publications, such as The Onion, deliberately engage in satire but give the publication the design elements of a newspaper and it is not unheard of for other publications to offer the occasional, humorous articles appearing on April Fool's Day.

=== Relationship with freedom of the press ===
In countries without freedom of the press, the above-described standards of journalism are less relevant for reporters than rules surrounding censorship and avoiding politically sensitive or taboo topics. Non-free media may be prohibited from criticising the national government, serve as a de facto distributor of propaganda, and/or engage in self-censorship. Various other forms of censorship may restrict reporting on issues the government deems sensitive. Similarly, media outlets reliant on corporate sponsorship, sponsored content, or corporate owners may prioritise the financial interests or political viewpoints of their owners, advertisers, or sponsors and self-censor information that contradicts those viewpoints. In states with strong defamation laws, the risk of lawsuit may also have a chilling effect on journalists. By interfering with the aforementioned obligations of journalistic ethics, these factors illustrate the extent to which ethics in journalism are shaped by the law surrounding journalism.

Freedom of the press is expressly protected by section 2 of the Canadian Charter of Rights and Freedoms and section 16 of the South African Bill of Rights, and is protected as part of freedom of expression under Article 10 of the European Convention on Human Rights. In Canada, freedom of the press and other Charter rights are subject to section 1 of the Canadian Charter of Rights and Freedoms which provides that rights are subject to such restrictions as can demonstrably be justified in a free and democratic society, from which courts have developed the Oakes test. The South African Bill of Rights, and the constitutions of countries such as Kenya that were inspired by the post-Apartheid constitution of South Africa, provide for rights to be limited in a similar manner to the Oakes test, as codified in section 36 of the South African Bill of Rights. In South Africa and the signatories to the ECHR, freedom of the press is also subject to specific enumerated limits prohibiting hate speech, propaganda for war, and defamation.

In the United States, freedom of the press is protected under the First Amendment in the Bill of Rights. Under the First Amendment, the government is not allowed to censor the press. Unlike modern bills of rights such as the Canadian Charter or the South African Bill of Rights, the rights enumerated in the US Constitution are written so as to be absolute.

=== Variations, violations, and controversies ===
There are a number of finer points of journalistic procedure that foster disagreements in principle and variation in practice among "mainstream" journalists in the free press. Laws concerning libel and slander vary from country to country, and local journalistic standards may be tailored to fit. For example, the United Kingdom has a broader definition of libel than the United States. Accuracy is important as a core value and to maintain credibility, but especially in broadcast media, audience share often gravitates toward outlets that are reporting new information first. Different organizations may balance speed and accuracy in different ways. The New York Times, for instance, tends to print longer, more detailed, less speculative, and more thoroughly verified pieces a day or two later than many other newspapers. 24-hour television news networks tend to place much more emphasis on getting the "scoop". Here, viewers may switch channels at a moment's notice; with fierce competition for ratings and a large amount of airtime to fill, fresh material is very valuable. Because of the fast turn-around, reporters for these networks may be under considerable time pressure, which reduces their ability to verify information.

Laws with regard to personal privacy, official secrets, and media disclosure of names and facts from criminal cases and civil lawsuits differ widely, and journalistic standards may vary accordingly. Different organizations may have different answers to questions about when it is journalistically acceptable to skirt, circumvent, or even break these regulations. Another example of differences surrounding harm reduction is the reporting of preliminary election results. In the United States, some news organizations feel that it is harmful to the democratic process to report exit poll results or preliminary returns while voting is still open. Such reports may influence people who vote later in the day, or who are in western time zones, in their decisions about how and whether or not to vote. There is also some concern that such preliminary results are often inaccurate and may be misleading to the public. Other outlets feel that this information is a vital part of the transparency of the election process, and see no harm (if not considerable benefit) in reporting it.

Objectivity as a journalistic standard varies to some degree depending on the industry and country. For example, the government-funded BBC in the United Kingdom places a strong emphasis on political neutrality, but British newspapers more often tend to adopt political affiliations or leanings in both coverage and audience, sometimes explicitly. In the United States, major newspapers usually explicitly claim objectivity as their goal in news coverage, though most have separate editorial boards that endorse specific candidates and publish opinions on specific issues. Adherence to a claimed standard of objectivity is a constant subject of debate. For example, mainstream national cable news channels in the United States claim political objectivity but to various degrees, Fox News has been accused of conservative bias and MSNBC accused of liberal bias. The degree to which these leanings influence cherry-picking of facts, factual accuracy, the predominance of non-news opinion and commentators, audience opinion of the issues and candidates covered, visual composition, tone and vocabulary of stories is hotly debated.

News value is generally used to select stories for print, broadcast, blogs, and web portals, including those that focus on a specific topic. To a large degree, news value depends on the target audience. For example, a minor story in the United States is more likely to appear on CNN than a minor story in the Middle East which might be more likely to appear on Al Jazeera simply due to the geographic distribution of the channels' respective audiences. It is a matter of debate whether this means that either network is less than objective, and that controversy is even more complicated when considering coverage of political stories for different audiences that have different political demographics (as with Fox News vs. MSNBC).

Some digital media platforms can use criteria to choose stories which are different from traditional news values. For example, while the Google News portal essentially chooses stories based on news value (though indirectly, through the choices of large numbers of independent outlets), users can set Google Alerts on specific terms which define personal subjective interests. Search engines, news aggregators, and social network feeds sometimes change the presentation of content depending on the consumer's expressed or inferred preferences or leanings. This has both been cheered as bypassing traditional "gatekeepers" and whatever biases they may have in favor of audience-centric selection criteria, but criticized as creating a dangerous filter bubble which intentionally or unintentionally hides dissenting opinions and other content which might be important for the audience to see in order to avoid exposure bias and groupthink.

=== Taste, decency, and acceptability ===
Audiences have different reactions to depictions of violence, nudity, coarse language, or to people in any other situation that is unacceptable to or stigmatized by the local culture or laws (such as the consumption of alcohol, homosexuality, illegal drug use, scatological images, etc.). Even with similar audiences, different organizations and even individual reporters have different standards and practices. These decisions often revolve around what facts are necessary for the audience to know. When certain distasteful or shocking material is considered important to the story, there are a variety of common methods for mitigating negative audience reaction. Advance warning of explicit or disturbing material may allow listeners or readers to avoid content they would rather not be exposed to. Offensive words may be partially obscured or bleeped. Potentially offensive images may be blurred or narrowly cropped. Descriptions may be substituted for pictures; graphic detail might be omitted. Disturbing content might be moved from a cover to an inside page, or from daytime to late evening when children are less likely to be watching.

There is often considerable controversy over these techniques, especially concern that obscuring or not reporting certain facts or details is self-censorship, which compromises objectivity and fidelity to the truth, and does not serve the public interest. For example, images and graphic descriptions of war are often violent, bloody, shocking and profoundly tragic. This makes certain content disturbing to some audience members, but it is precisely these aspects of war that some consider to be the most important to convey. Some argue that "sanitizing" the depiction of war influences public opinion about the merits of continuing to fight, and about the policies or circumstances that precipitated the conflict. The amount of explicit violence and mutilation depicted in war coverage varies considerably from time to time, from organization to organization, and from country to country. Reporters have also been accused of indecency in the process of collecting news, namely that they are overly intrusive in the name of journalistic insensitivity. War correspondent Edward Behr recounts the story of a reporter during the Congo Crisis who walked into a crowd of Belgian evacuees and shouted, "Anyone here been raped and speaks English?"

=== Campaigning in the media ===
Many print publications take advantage of their wide readership and print persuasive pieces in the form of unsigned editorials that represent the official position of the organization. Despite the ostensible separation between editorial writing and news gathering, this practice may cause some people to doubt the political objectivity of the publication's news reporting. Other publications and many broadcast media only publish opinion pieces that are attributed to a particular individual (who may be an in-house analyst) or to an outside entity. One particularly controversial question is whether media organizations should endorse political candidates for office. Political endorsements create more opportunities to construe favoritism in reporting, and can create a perceived conflict of interest.

=== Investigative methods ===
Investigative journalism is largely an information-gathering exercise, looking for facts that are not easy to obtain by simple requests and searches, or are actively being concealed, suppressed or distorted. Where investigative work involves undercover journalism or use of whistleblowers, and even more if it resorts to covert methods more typical of private detectives or even spying, it brings a large extra burden on ethical standards. Anonymous sources are double-edged—they often provide especially newsworthy information, such as classified or confidential information about current events, information about a previously unreported scandal, or the perspective of a particular group that may fear retribution for expressing certain opinions in the press. The downside is that the condition of anonymity may make it difficult or impossible for the reporter to verify the source's statements. Sometimes news sources hide their identities from the public because their statements would otherwise quickly be discredited. Thus, statements attributed to anonymous sources may carry more weight with the public than they might if they were attributed. The Washington press has been criticized in recent years for excessive use of anonymous sources, in particular to report information that is later revealed to be unreliable. The use of anonymous sources increased markedly in the period before the 2003 invasion of Iraq.

=== Ethical dilemmas ===
One of the primary functions of journalism ethics is to aid journalists in dealing with many ethical dilemmas they may encounter. From highly sensitive issues of national security to everyday questions such as accepting a dinner from a source, putting a bumper sticker on one's car, publishing a personal opinion blog, a journalist must make decisions taking into account things such as the public's right to know, potential threats, reprisals and intimidations of all kinds, personal integrity, conflicts between editors, reporters and publishers or management, and many other such conundrums. The following are illustrations of some of those.

- The Pentagon Papers dealt with extremely difficult ethical dilemmas faced by journalists. Despite government intervention, The Washington Post, joined by The New York Times, felt the public interest was more compelling and both published reports. The cases went to the Supreme Court where they were merged and are known as New York Times Co. v. United States, 403 U.S. 713.
- The Ethics AdviceLine for Journalists, a joint venture, public service project of Chicago Headline Club Chapter of the Society of Professional Journalists and Loyola University Chicago's Center for Ethics and Social Justice, provides some examples of typical ethical dilemmas reported to their ethical dilemma hotline and are typical of the kinds of questions faced by many professional journalists, including the following:
  - Is it ethical to make an appointment to interview an arsonist sought by police, without informing police in advance of the interview?
  - Is lack of proper attribution plagiarism?
  - Should a reporter write a story about a local priest who confessed to a sex crime if it will cost the newspaper readers and advertisers who are sympathetic to the priest?
  - Is it ethical for a reporter to write a news piece on the same topic after writing an opinion piece in the same paper?
  - Under what circumstances do you identify a person who was arrested as a relative of a public figure, such as a local sports star?
  - Freelance journalists and photographers accept cash to write about, or take photos of, events with the promise of attempting to get their work on the AP or other news outlets, from which they also will be paid. Is that ethical?
  - Can a journalist reveal a source of information after guaranteeing confidentiality if the source proves to be unreliable?

=== Artificial intelligence ===
Scholars and journalists alike have raised concerns regarding transparency, accountability, bias and the preservation of core journalistic values. Researchers caution that AI-generated content, if not transparently labeled and verified, may blur the lines between fact and fabrication, especially in the context of deepfakes or manipulated audio and video. The Associated Press Stylebook also advises clearly labeling AI-generated material to maintain transparency and trust with audiences.

Automation has raised concerns over the reduction of editorial staff and the potential devaluation of traditional journalistic skills. Scholars warn that over-reliance on technology could compromise investigative depth and ethical judgment.

In response to these challenges, several media organizations and academic institutions have begun to develop AI-specific ethical guidelines. These guidelines typically emphasize fairness, transparency, data governance and human oversight. For example, the BBC has implemented machine learning principles grounded in its public service values, offering teams a checklist for ethical AI use. Nonetheless, scholars note that there is limited empirical evidence on how widely such guidelines are enforced in practice. There are also concerns that guidelines may be used more for public relations purposes than for genuine accountability, a phenomenon known as "ethics washing."

Experts agree that human journalists remain essential. AI struggles with accuracy, adequately summarizing information, understanding nuance, cultural context and emotional tone, all of which are critical to ethical and effective reporting. Therefore, many scholars and professionals advocate to refrain from using it, and if it is to be used, then a "human-in-the-loop" model, where AI tools assist rather than do journalists' work.

==== Transparency ====
A common concern is the "black box" nature of AI algorithms, which makes it difficult for both journalists and the public to understand how editorial decisions are made. Transparency efforts include clearly labeling AI-generated content and disclosing how algorithms influence reporting and recommendations.

==== Accountability ====
As AI systems assume greater editorial functions, questions arise regarding who is responsible for errors, misinformation or bias in algorithmic output. Scholars emphasize the need for human oversight and institutional mechanisms to monitor and audit AI performance.

==== Bias and discrimination ====
AI systems may replicate or amplify societal biases found in training data. For instance, researchers have found that language and image models can reinforce gender, racial and political stereotypes. These risks are particularly acute when AI is used for content selection or framing. In a 2025 survey of 2,000 journalists carried out by Pressat, 80% of journalists expressed concern that AI-generated news could be biased or discriminatory.

=== Personalization and distribution via algorithms ===
Social media platforms and AI-based recommendation engines have transformed how news is disseminated to the public. These systems often prioritize engagement metrics, tailoring content to individual users' behavior and preferences. While this personalization can enhance user experience, it also risks reinforcing ideological echo chambers and limiting exposure to diverse viewpoints. This algorithmic filtering may conflict with journalistic goals of inclusivity and democratic deliberation. News recommender systems, widely used on platforms such as Facebook, Google News and proprietary publisher apps, have been shown to contribute to the formation of "filter bubbles", where users are shown content that aligns with their existing beliefs. Researchers argue that this limits pluralism and weakens public discourse, especially when AI systems operate without clear editorial oversight.

== Journalistic misconduct ==
Journalistic scandals can reduce trust and credibility of journalism.

== See also ==
- Brown envelope journalism
- Chinese wall § Journalism
- Churnalism
- Citizen journalism
- Code of ethics in media
- Ethical Journalism Initiative
- History of American newspapers
- History of journalism
- Hostile media effect
- International Federation of Journalists
- Mediatization, on the democratic role of journalism
- Munich Charter
- New York Press Club
- Objectivity (journalism)
- Order of the Occult Hand
- Organisation of News Ombudsmen
- Parachute journalism
- Reporters Without Borders
