= Ian Mayes =

British journalist and editor

- Occupations: Journalist, editor and author
- Known for: First newspaper "readers' editor"
- Notable credit: The Guardian

Ian Mayes is a British journalist and editor. He was the first "readers' editor" – a title he invented for the newspaper ombudsman role — of The Guardian, from November 1997 to March 2007, and was president of the international Organization of News Ombudsmen from May 2005 to May 2007, serving as a board member from May 2002 after joining in April 2001.

Mayes is the author of books including Witness in a Time of Turmoil: Inside the Guardian's Global Revolution, Volume 1, 1986–1995, published in 2025, and Witness in a Time of Trial: Inside the Guardian’s Global Revolution Volume Two: 1995–2009, published in 2026.

== Background ==
Ian Mayes' career as a journalist spans six decades and includes many years as features editor of the Northampton Chronicle and Echo, before he joined BBC Radio News in Broadcasting House (1979–87), then became assistant features editor of the short-lived London Daily News.

Mayes began writing for The Guardian as a freelance in 1962, his first piece being a story on the features page (then edited by Brian Redhead) about the return of Laurie Lee to the village of Slad in Gloucestershire, where Cider with Rosie was set. It was towards the end of 1988 that Mayes joined the staff of the newspaper; his first ten years included launching The Guardian Weekend magazine and the daily G2 section with former editor Alan Rusbridger, and time served as deputy features editor, arts editor and obituaries editor.

=== Readers' Editor ===
From November 1997 to March 2007, Mayes was The Guardian's Readers' Editor – a title he invented for the newspaper ombudsman role to suggest a bridge between readers and journalists — the first such appointment of a resident independent ombudsman in the UK. The New York Times quoted him as saying: "In a lot of papers, they see admitting a mistake as a sign of weakness....But if you feel that you're producing a newspaper with an intelligent readership, why not treat them as intelligent? Why not display the same degree of openness and frankness that we expect from others?" Other British newspapers, including The Observer, The Independent on Sunday and the Daily Mirror, quickly followed suit in appointing readers' editors, although Mayes was the only one to do the job full-time. The Guardian system was also closely replicated on newspapers such as Politiken in Denmark and The Hindu in India.

Through an influential weekly column called "Open Door", Mayes dealt with corrections and clarifications (14,000 in his decade in the post), as well as conducting a debate on the ethics of journalism. Selections from the columns were collected in four books: Corrections and Clarifications (2000), Corrections and Clarifications 2002 (2002), Only Correct: The Best of Corrections and Clarifications (2005) and Journalism Right and Wrong: Ethical and Other Issues Raised by Readers in the Guardian's Open Door Column. A translated selection of the columns was produced by Moscow State University under the title Rabota nad oshibkami (Work on mistakes).

He was president of the international Organization of News Ombudsmen (ONO) from May 2005 to May 2007, serving as a board member from May 2002, after joining in April 2001. He has lectured and taken part in seminars on the function of ombudsmen in the media nationally and internationally (including in the US, Russia, Scandinavia, and Slovenia), inspiring newspapers in other parts of the world to create their own readers' editors; typically, The Hindu has referenced "the exemplary practice and experience of The Guardian, whose pioneering RE, Ian Mayes, had set the bar high." He is credited with the discovery of the "apostrofly", "an insect which lands at random on the printed page depositing an apostrophe wherever it alights". His last column as Readers' Editor appeared on 2 April 2007, since when he has been an associate editor of The Guardian.

He has been honoured by the creation of "The Ian Mayes Award for Writing Wrongs" in 2008.

=== Official history of The Guardian ===
Mayes subsequently began researching and writing the third modern volume of the official history of The Guardian (following earlier books by David Ayerst and Geoffrey Taylor), beginning in 1986, his aim being to "humanise the decisions that have shaped the Guardian and its editorial line". Drawing on more than 100 interviews, Witness in a Time of Turmoil: Inside the Guardian's Global Revolution, Volume 1, 1986–1995 was published in May 2025. The review by historian Joe Moran stated: "Covering nine years in more than 300 pages, this book has all the comprehensiveness of an official history. ...But Mayes enlivens his narrative throughout with humorous touches and compelling character sketches." The second volume, Witness in a Time of Trial: Inside the Guardian's Global Revolution Volume Two: 1995–2009, was published in January 2026.

=== Hazlitt Society ===
Mayes was instrumental in the project to restore William Hazlitt's grave, after visiting the original neglected gravestone in St Anne's Churchyard early in 2001. The restored grave was unveiled by Michael Foot on the 225th anniversary of Hazlitt's birth, 10 April 2003. Mayes was closely involved with the subsequent formation of the Hazlitt Society, of which he was inaugural chairman.

== Works ==
=== Bibliography ===
- Samuel De Wilde, c.1751-1832: Theatre in Georgian and Regency London : George James De Wilde, 1804-1871, The life and times of Victorian Northampton: An exhibition at Northampton Central Art Gallery, 4 September to 2 October, 1971 (Northampton Museums and Art Gallery, 1971).
- Corrections and Clarifications (Fourth Estate, 2000), ISBN 978-1-84115-608-8, and (Guardian Books, 2000), ISBN 978-1-84115-603-3
- Corrections and Clarifications 2002 (Atlantic Books, 2002), ISBN 978-1-84354-173-8
- Only Correct: The Best of Corrections and Clarifications (Guardian Books, 2005), ISBN 978-1-84354-465-4
- Journalism Right and Wrong: Ethical and Other Issues Raised by Readers in the Guardian's Open Door Column (Guardian Books, February 2007), ISBN 978-0-00-719667-8
- Witness in a Time of Turmoil: Inside the Guardian's Global Revolution, Volume 1, 1986–1995 (Guardian Books, 2025), ISBN 9781916204768.
- Witness in a Time of Trial: Inside the Guardian’s Global Revolution Volume Two: 1995–2009 (Guardian Books, 2026), ISBN 978-1916204782.

=== Selected articles ===
- "John Bell, The British Theatre and Samuel De Wilde", Apollo, 113 (1981), pp. 99–103.
- "Inside the cocoon" (review of Marcel Proust: Selected Letters, vol 2, 1904-1909, edited by Philip Kolb), The Guardian, 18 January 1990.
- "On an unsound footing: The readers' editor on... the role of syntax in dancing", The Guardian, 8 January 1999.
- "Black and white cases", The Guardian, 6 March 1999.
- "Abuse of trust", The Guardian, 10 June 2000.
- "Funny ha ha", The Guardian, 30 December 2000.
- "Snap decision", The Guardian, 20 January 2001.
- "Snap judgment", The Guardian, 12 January 2002.
- "Words' worth", The Guardian, 16 February 2002.
- "Matters of approximate fact", The Guardian, 21 October 2002.
- "A few quiet words for culture", Open Door, The Guardian, 22 November 2003.
- "A change, of course", The Guardian, 14 February 2004.
- "Unspeakable but readable", The Guardian, 28 August 2004.
- "The return of the apostrofly", Open Door, The Guardian, 4 December 2004.
- "Shaping up for the future", The Guardian, 23 July 2005.
- "Laughter in a house of correction", in The Guardian, 6 August 2005.
- "'Why should newspapers not be accountable?'", Open Door, The Guardian, 22 October 2017.

== Personal life ==
Mayes is the father of Isabella McGuire Mayes, the first and youngest British dancer to train at the Mariinsky Ballet's Vaganova Academy in Saint Petersburg, Russia.
