= Arts journalism =

Arts journalism is a branch of journalism concerned with the reporting and discussion of the arts including, but not limited to, the visual arts, film, literature, music, theater, and architecture.

Traditionally, journalists and critics writing about the arts have backgrounds in writing and the arts; apart from baccalaureate studies in literary criticism, the humanities, and art history, there is no other formal advanced journalistic training in this field.

For instance, an art magazine is a publication with the main topic being art, and is contributed to by people from the practice of artmaking, curating, critical theory, or teaching, among other functions—whether they be institution-based, academy-based, or independent/self-taught. Such a magazine can be published in print, online, or both, and may be aimed at different audiences, including galleries, buyers, amateur or professional artists, and the general public. In short, art magazines can be either trade or consumer magazines, or both.

There are also radio and TV features covering art topics.

== History to present-day ==
Arts journalism has been one method of discussing and engaging the public with the arts for over a century. Journals such as L'artiste, created in 1831, provided perceptions on exhibits and patterns of contemporary art in the nineteenth century, as well as art criticism. All over the world, journalists have reported on dancing, architecture, fine arts, and crafting to bring culture and art to readers.

Today, arts journalism has an extended reach due to the impact of developing technology, such as social media. Some studies on arts journalism explore how technology has impacted the way the general public views art, an example being that performances are now videoed live and images can be instantly uploaded.

Articles have been published on the change in focus from various arts to others due to arts journalism. In a study regarding arts journalism in American, French, German, and Dutch newspapers from 1955 to 2005, researchers found increased content on pop culture and cultural advertising, especially in American newspapers.

Arts journalism is sometimes referred to as cultural journalism because art journalists often cover cultural events with artistic aspects and aesthetic influence. Their reports provide insight to the background of these events and often include reviews and reflections on exhibits.

Art and cultural journalists can publish issues which would otherwise never be present in the media, such as issues of creativity and aesthetics in Christian art, particularly since about 2000, when the landscape of arts journalism had been changing with fewer full-time critics, putting as a result a lens on issues (such as public and corporate funding or their lack) around art and culture.

== See also ==
- Ethical Journalism Initiative
- Journal of Religion and Theatre
