= Micro-inequity =

Concept in anthropology

A micro-inequity is a small, often overlooked act of exclusion or bias that could convey a lack of respect, recognition, or fairness towards marginalized individuals. These acts can manifest in various ways, such as consistently interrupting or dismissing the contributions of a particular group during meetings or discussions. The theory of micro-inequity helps elucidate how individuals may experience being overlooked, ignored, or harmed based on characteristics like race, gender, or other perceived attributes of disadvantage, including political views and marital status. This falls within the broader marginalizing micro-level dynamics that refer to subtle, often unnoticed mechanisms within a society that contribute to the exclusion, disempowerment, or disadvantage of certain individuals or groups. These dynamics operate at a granular level, perpetuating inequalities and disparities in resource distribution, access to opportunities, and overall participation in social, economic, and political spheres. Micro-inequities, micro-affirmations, and micro-advantages are often executed using coded language or subtle non-verbal cues, formally in written communications or informally in conversations, known as micro-messaging. The term originated in 1973.

== Overview ==
Maryville University defines micro-inequities as subtle messages that devalue, discourage, and impair workplace performance. These messages are conveyed through facial expressions, gestures, tone of voice, word choices, nuance, and syntax that are relayed both consciously and unconsciously. Repeated sending or receiving of micro-inequities can erode personal and professional relationships. The Star-Ledger article, "Micro-messages Matter" by Steve Adubato says that, "only the most astute and aware communicators recognize how [micro-messages] are received and perceived."

These messages can reveal more about the true nature of a relationship than words alone. The messages function as the core of how unconscious bias is communicated and how workplace exclusion is experienced. In the Profiles in Diversity Journal article "The DNA of Culture Change," Joyce Tucker writes, "Organizations have done a great job at controlling the big, easily-seen offensive behaviors but have been somewhat blind to what is rarely observed. Organizations have done great work at controlling the few elephants while being overrun by a phalanx of ants. Listening with your arms folded, losing eye contact with the person you're speaking with, or even the way you move your lips to shape a smile—in any given conversation, we may send hundreds of messages, often without even saying a word. Just as television or radio waves surround us, yet we never see them, these micro-messages are just as pervasive and nearly as difficult to discern."

== Early studies ==
Mary Rowe of MIT, coined the terms micro-inequities and micro-affirmations in 1973, building upon previous research on micro-aggression by Chester Pierce, specifically around racial hostility. Originally, Rowe referred to micro-inequities as the "Saturn's Ring Phenomenon" because the planet's rings protect and insulate it from the harshness of the world outside, much like the workplace culture created by micro-affirmations. Some of these papers were published in whole or in part in 1974. After that, a relatively complete version came out in 1990. Rowe published a longer article, "Micro-affirmations and Micro-inequities," in the Journal of the International Ombudsman Association, which includes more of her hypotheses about the importance of micro-affirmations. Earlier works in the same genre include that of Jean-Paul Sartre, who wrote about small acts of anti-Semitism, and Chester Pierce, who wrote about micro-aggressions as acts of racism and "childish" acts against children.

Mary Rowe's original research studied the impact micro-messages have on the academic community and relationships in general in the United States and worldwide. The first broad introduction of micro-inequities in the corporate workplace was initiated in 2002 by Insight Education Systems. It established the link between micro-messaging and corporate diversity and inclusion initiatives.

== Definition ==
In the original articles on this subject in the 1970s (see references below), Mary Rowe defined micro-inequities as "apparently small events which are often ephemeral and hard-to-prove, events which are covert, often unintentional, frequently unrecognized by the perpetrator, which occur wherever people are perceived to be different." She wrote about homophobia, reactions to perceived disabilities, reactions to physical appearance, reverse discrimination against white and Black males in traditionally female environments, and various religious slights. She collected instances of micro-inequities anywhere at work or in communities—anywhere in the world—that people are perceived to be "different."

These differences indeed reach beyond unchangeable characteristics such as race or gender. In his book, "Micro messaging: Why Great Leadership is Beyond Words" (2006 McGraw-Hill), Stephen Young describes the impact micro-inequities have on an individual's workplace performance through additional factors, such as one's political views, marital status, tenure, style, resistance to comply with status quo and other characteristics that are changeable.

Young states that these drivers of unconscious bias reflect the positions people hold about others that are influenced by past experiences, forming filters that cause conclusions to be reached about a group or ethnicity through methods other than active thought or reasoning. The critical limitation of unconscious bias is that it is a concept, a state of mind, and therefore not consciously or intentionally displayed. The only way unconscious biases are manifested is through the subtle messages individuals send—typically, micro-inequities affect the performance of others.

== Micro-affirmations and micro-advantages ==
A micro-affirmation, in Rowe's writing, is the reverse phenomenon. Micro-affirmations are subtle or small acknowledgments of a person's value and accomplishments. They may take the shape of public recognition of the person, "opening a door," referring positively to a person's work, commending someone on the spot, or making a happy introduction. "Small" affirmations form the basis of successful mentoring, effective networks, successful colleague-ships, and most caring relationships. They may lead to greater self-esteem and improved performance. In 2015, Rowe collected her hypotheses about the potential power of micro-affirmations:

1. "Blocking unconscious bias: We could try to practice—all the time—affirming the achievements of others. If we always look for excellence in the work of others and are universally respectful, may we be able to block our own unconscious bias?
2. Ameliorate damage: Can micro-affirmations (for example, in affinity groups and mentoring programs) make up for some of the damage caused by unconscious bias?
3. Meeting a core emotional concern: Since research suggests that appreciation and affirmation are core concerns for all of us, may this plan help in making the workplace more productive?
4. Evoking reciprocal affirmation: Since research suggests an impulse toward "reciprocity," may affirm behavior spread as we respond to support from others?
5. A possible role modeling effect: Research suggests that people are sensitive to the morale and happiness of those around them and especially sensitive to the behavior of a local manager. If managers, bystanders, and others are role models for affirming behavior, will some others follow suit? Peers and bystanders are often the most important actors because they are most likely to be present where people act in a biased fashion.
6. Rectifying our own unconscious bias: Research suggests that behavior follows attitudes. Attitudes also can be changed by behavior. If we consciously improve our behavior, may we lessen our unconscious bias?"

In 2021, Mary Rowe wrote of the influence of micro-affirmations in building a sense of "belonging."

There is a difference between "inequality" and "inequity." Inequality implies there is some comparison being made. For example, if a boss doesn't listen attentively to an employee, that in and of itself is not a micro-inequality. However, if the boss listens attentively to all of an employee's coworkers but not that employee, that might be a micro-inequality.

Inequity, by contrast, is simply something that may be perceived as unfair or unjust under the circumstances. Thus, a micro-inequity may occur with only one person present if that person is treated unfairly or unjustly. Similarly, a micro-affirmation may refer to "only one" person and does not imply any sense of advantage over others but rather provides support, inspiration, and encouragement to the affirmed individual.

An alternate perspective to Mary Rowe's "reverse phenomenon" of micro-affirmations theory is Stephen Young's introduction of a third layer, micro-advantages. Micro-advantages are subtle, often unconscious, messages that motivate, inspire, and enhance workplace performance. Like micro-inequities, they are conveyed through facial expressions, gestures, tone of voice, choice of words, nuance and syntax. Applied effectively, micro-advantages can unlock employee potential, enabling engagement, creativity, loyalty, and performance. Micro-advantages are central to effective leadership. An affirmation is a statement asserting existence or truth in a way that helps the person affirmed; a micro-advantage is a subtle message that motivates and inspires performance in the workplace or classroom.

== In culture ==
Micro-inequities may concern race, religion, color, disability, sexual identity, social class, and national origin. Some are embodied in language that links certain derogatory stereotypes with a particular race. Examples of such micro-inequities would be the terms "an Indian giver" and "to gyp," or the phrase "to Jew down." Other examples include the casual use of the term "she" while referring to individuals in occupations that have been predominantly women, such as teachers, nurses, and secretaries, and the disrespect sometimes exhibited toward fathers as full-time homemakers.

Elimination of micro-inequities is a current focus of some universities, businesses, and government agencies as a key diversity strategy. According to some experts, micro-inequities can slowly and methodically erode a person's motivation and sense of worth. This may result in absenteeism, poor employee retention, and loss of productivity. In the article "Sizing Up What's Being Said" in The Sacramento Bee, nine techniques are outlined that help minimize the negative effect of micro-inequities.

Modern media is also responsible for the perpetuation of micro-inequities. People of color have been portrayed negatively; eminent people of color are poorly represented in Western media. Examples would include the fallacious belief that African Americans are the majority of those on welfare in the US. Many Native Americans are sensitive to the idea that "Columbus discovered" their land. Feagin and Benokraitis note that the mass media has portrayed women negatively in many respects; for example, women are portrayed as sexual objects in many music videos.

In Julie Rowe's Time Magazine article "Why Your Boss May Be Sweating the Small Stuff," she outlines workplace micro-inequity applications and how they influence performance. Rowe states, "It used to be that [micro-inequities were] tone-deaf moments used to buttress discrimination claims. Now they are becoming the basis for [validating] those claims."

There are distinct differences between the effects of micro-messaging in the academic community versus the corporate workplace. Students, by and large, rely on being the recipients of the knowledge provided by the educator. In the workplace, it is a collaborative environment where leaders rely and depend on the knowledge and skills of team members. Raising the knowledge of micro-messaging in the corporate sector can "make even hardened executives recognize themselves, or at the very least, their superiors" as senders of micro-inequities, according to Young. Since micro-inequities represent each person's status quo of behavior, it normally requires experiential examples on the receiving side to understand their impact on altering performance. Stephen Young and Mary Rowe agree, "A good way to deal with micro-inequities is to bring them to the forefront through discussion."

== Further research and controversy ==
Mary Rowe defined micro-inequities as "small events that may be ephemeral and hard to prove" and stated that "it is not easy to measure the effects of gender micro-inequities because effects of unfair behavior may differ by context." There is a growing body of scholarly research on unconscious bias. Much of the modern approach has used an Implicit Association Test rather than Questionnaires or interviews. However, many scholars have published articles and analyses doubting the efficacy and validity of this research.

A book on the same subject was written pseudonymously in the late 1970s by Mary Howell, MD, of Harvard Medical School. Under the name of "Margaret Campbell, MD," Howell wrote, "Why Would a 'Girl' Want to go into Medicine?"

Wesley E. Profit wrote his Harvard doctoral thesis on the micro-inequities of racism. Ellen Spertus, an MIT student at the time, did a small study, "Why Are There So Few Female Computer Scientists?", MIT Artificial Intelligence Laboratory Technical Report 1315, August 1991. This is one of many such studies from various departments at MIT.

Frances K. Conley, then of Stanford Medical School, published "Walking Out on the Boys" in 1998, which deals with her experience as a woman neurosurgeon and sexism in the medical profession. Stephen Young uses the concept of "micro-advantages," rather than "micro-affirmations." He published "Micro-Messaging" in 2006 (McGraw-Hill). Scholarly works include "Why So Slow? The Advancement of Women" by Virginia Valian, MIT Press, 1999, and the article "What Knowers Know Well: Women, Work, and the Academy," Alison Wylie, University of Washington, 2009.

Recently, a great deal of work has been done by various consultants, experts doing research in the social sciences and neuroscience, and leaders in the field of diversity. After earning a communications degree from Emerson College, Stephen Young entered finance and eventually became senior vice president of JP Morgan Chase, managing the firm's global diversity strategy. Inspired by MIT Professor Mary P. Rowe's decades of research into what she called "micro-inequities" in colleges and the workplace, he became a consultant and developed seminars to sensitize executives to the full range of what he calls "micro-messages." Young's company, Insight Education Systems, founded in 2002, has helped implement his program at Starbucks, Raytheon, Cisco, IBM, Merck, and other Fortune 500 corporations.
