= Jeffrey Dvorkin =

Canadian journalist

Jeffrey A. Dvorkin (born September 15, 1946) is a Canadian-American journalist.

A Vice President of News and ombudsman for National Public Radio from 1997 to 2006, Dvorkin moved to the United States in 1997 following a lengthy career with the Canadian Broadcasting Corporation in Toronto and Montreal, where he was Managing Editor and Chief Journalist for CBC Radio.

Since the early 1990s, Dvorkin has served as an international consultant and educator, advocating for a free press along with colleagues from around the world. He is also a past president of the Organization of News Ombudsmen and served as the Executive Director for ONO from 2009 to 2013. He is a board member of the Canadian Journalism Forum on Violence and Trauma and the International News Safety Institute - two groups working to improve physical and psychological conditions for journalists working on stressful or dangerous assignments.

While serving as NPR's ombudsman, Dvorkin authored a column on issues pertaining to journalistic ethics. He also co-authored with Prof. Alan G. Stavitsky of the University of Oregon, Ethics Guide for Public Radio under the auspices of the Corporation for Public Broadcasting, for which Dvorkin has contributed a number of studies on objectivity and balance.

He co-authored a paper on Media Ethics and Management with Kashmir Birk and presented it to a conference held in October 2012, under the auspices of the Reuters Institute for the Study of Journalism at the University of Oxford.

In 2006, Dvorkin was named Executive Director of the Committee of Concerned Journalists based in Washington, D.C., and professor at the Missouri School of Journalism. Dvorkin resigned in July 2007 to be an adjunct professor of media ethics and faculty adviser for four student newspapers at Georgetown University in Washington, DC.

In August 2008, he was named to be the Rogers Communications Distinguished Visiting Professor of Journalism and Professor of Distinction at Ryerson University in Toronto, Ontario, Canada.

From 2011 until 2020, Dvorkin was Lecturer and Director of the Journalism Program at the University of Toronto Scarborough.

Dvorkin blogs and frequently appears as a media analyst. He is also an advisor to a group involved with the mental health issues of journalists in general, and war correspondents in particular. Dvorkin co-authored an article on the Toronto Scale of Moral Injury of Journalists with Jonas Osmann.

In May 2009, Dvorkin was named first Executive Director of the Organization of News Ombudsmen at ONO's annual conference in Washington, DC. In 2010, he went to Guinea and Niger on behalf of the US Department of State to help journalists in those countries prepare to cover the first free elections in their history. In 2011, Dvorkin was asked to speak at a UNESCO conference in Paris on media self-regulation. In June 2011, he went to Chisinau, Moldova for a conference - also on media self-regulation - hosted by the Council of Europe.

Born in Calgary, Alberta, Canada, Dvorkin graduated from the University of Alberta with an Honours B.A. in History and French. He has an M.A. in Modern European History from the University of Toronto and a Masters of Philosophy in International History from the London School of Economics.

He is the author of a journalism textbook, "Trusting the News in a Digital Age" published by Wiley Blackwell in 2021.
