= Mary Rowe =

Founding president of the International Ombuds Association

- Born: 1936 (age 89–90)

Academic background
- Education: Swarthmore College; Columbia University

Academic work
- Discipline: conflict resolution
- Institutions: MIT Sloan School of Management
- Main interests: "micro-inequities" "zero-barrier office"

Mary P. Rowe (born 1936) is an adjunct professor of Negotiation and Conflict Management at the MIT Sloan School of Management, where she specializes in the areas of conflict resolution, negotiation and risk management.

In her 40+ year career as a Special Assistant to the President and Chancellor of Massachusetts Institute of Technology (MIT), Rowe became a model for the role of ombud. Rowe was a founding member and the first President of the Corporate Ombudsman Association (COA), now the International Ombuds Association. She coined the term "zero-barrier office" to describe the desired position of an ombud within an institution.

In her professional and research interests, Rowe considers kinds of power in interpersonal negotiations and how to understand and address issues of harassment, dispute resolution and unacceptable behavior. As an ombuds at MIT, Rowe has worked with people at all levels to develop techniques for dealing with reports of sexual harassment and all other workplace issues. Her work informed MIT's first harassment policy.

In 1973, she introduced the terms "micro-inequities" and "micro-affirmations", building on the work of Chester M. Pierce on microaggressions. Rowe and others recommend the intentional practice of using micro-affirmations to communicate that people are "welcome, visible, and capable" and improve academic and workplace culture for everyone involved. Rowe also studies bystander intervention and its importance for protective workplace systems.

== Early life and education ==
Mary Potter Rowe attended Swarthmore College, receiving a BA in history and international relations. Rowe earned her PhD in economics at Columbia University.

== Career ==
In 1973, Rowe became a Special Assistant to the President and Chancellor of Massachusetts Institute of Technology (MIT). Her title, initially "Special Assistant for Women and Work" became "Special Assistant to the President and Ombudsperson" when the MIT Ombuds Office was established in 1980. She continued in the position until 2014, serving under five MIT presidents. She worked closely with Clarence G. Williams, Special Assistant for Minority Affairs and later Ombudspersons Thomas Zgambo and Toni Robinson. Her work contributed to the formation of MIT's first harassment policy in 1973.

In her work at MIT, Rowe became a model for the position of ombud. She was initially empowered by then-president Jerome B. Wiesner and then-Chancellor Paul E. Gray to be an independent neutral party who would respond to anyone who came to her with concerns, in an impartial and confidential manner. Wiesner encouraged her not just to help individual people, but to look for flaws in the way the university worked as a system. He charged her: "Don’t let any problem happen twice."

Rowe coined the term "zero-barrier office" to describe the desired position of an ombuds within an institution. She worked with individual "visitors" to her office to develop options of their own choice for dealing with difficult situations and with good ideas that had not yet gotten traction. Upon request and with permission, she would help to bring issues to the attention of other decision-makers or the institution. This can involve "generic options" that protect the privacy of the specific person or persons who are surfacing the concern, while still enabling the organization to take action. For example, a compliance officer could be prompted to do a routine, unannounced "spot check", or a senior manager could discuss policies relating to an issue generally at a routine staff meeting

One of Rowe's techniques, "Drafting a Letter", involves drafting a private letter to a perceived offender, factually describing what had happened, their emotions relating to the incident, and a proposed remedy. Drafting such a letter helps visitors to clarify their own feelings and goals and then decide on various possible options. Rowe reported that in cases where the letter was privately sent by the writer to the addressee, this technique was highly effective in stopping specific problems. Having been sent, it could, if necessary, also provide evidence that the writer had requested that the behavior be stopped.

Rowe also coined the terms "micro-inequities" and "micro-affirmations" in 1973 to describe a type of interaction that was often reported to her office. She encourages the use of micro-affirmations as a way to improve institutional culture. (See section below.)

Rowe was a founding member of the Corporate Ombudsman Association (COA), which first met in 1982 at MIT. It was formally organized in 1984, with Rowe as its first President. In 1992, to better reflect its membership, the Corporate Ombudsman Association (COA) was renamed The Ombudsman Association (TOA). In July 2005, TOA joined with the university and College Ombudsman Association (UCOA, established 1985) to become the International Ombudsman Association (IOA). In 2021, it changed its name to the International Ombuds Association.

Rowe started the first (private and hidden) listserv for ombuds, enabling individuals at different institutions to share advice and develop new conflict management and intervention techniques. Rowe helped to develop techniques for dealing with reports of all kinds of harassment well before the federal government established the Equal Employment Opportunity Commission guidelines in 1980. Rowe has helped to document the wide range of situations that can be faced by ombuds, some of which can be extremely serious.

As of 1985, Rowe additionally became an adjunct professor of Negotiation and Conflict Management at the MIT Sloan School of Management. She worked with Robert McKersie to develop one of the first courses in negotiation and conflict management.

Rowe's papers are part of the Women@MIT archival collection. Many of her papers have been made freely readable under open access by the Negotiation Journal. As of 2023, a special issue of the Journal of the International Ombuds Association (JIOA) focus on Rowe's contributions to the field.

== Micro-inequities and micro-affirmations ==
Rowe coined the terms micro-inequities and micro-affirmations in 1973 while studying inclusion in the workplace at MIT. Rowe defined micro-inequities as "apparently small events which are often ephemeral and hard-to-prove, events which are covert, often unintentional, frequently unrecognized by the perpetrator, which occur wherever people are perceived to be different". She initially used the analogy of a "Saturn's rings phenomenon" to describe them; because the planet Saturn is surrounded by rings made of tiny bits of ice and sand that can act as a barrier to the planet. Rowe added the idea of micro-inequities to earlier seminal work by Dr. Chester Pierce about micro-aggressions, in order to include additional concerns which are perceived to be unfair.

Expanded discussions appeared in 1990 as "Barriers to Equality: The Power of Subtle Discrimination" and in 2008 as "Micro-affirmations and Micro-inequities". Rowe added the concept of unfair micro-inequities after being inspired by original research by Chester M. Pierce about microaggression, which originally focused on racism and behaviors that could easily be seen as hostile. She also credits earlier work in the same genre by Jean-Paul Sartre who wrote about small acts of anti-Semitism. Rowe's original research studied the impact micro-messages have on the academic community and society in general. She documented instances of micro-inequities, including instances where the effect was seen to be unfair, wherever people are perceived to be "different".

A micro-affirmation, in Rowe's writing, is the reverse phenomenon. Micro-affirmations are subtle or "apparently small acts, which are often ephemeral and hard-to-see, events that are public and private, often unconscious but very effective, which occur wherever people wish to help others to succeed". They acknowledge a person's value and accomplishments. They may take the shape of public recognition of the person, "opening a door," referring positively to the work of a person, commending someone on the spot, or making a happy introduction. Apparently, "small" affirmations form the basis of successful mentoring, effective networks, successful colleague-ships and of most caring relationships. They may lead to greater self-esteem and improved performance. Rowe and others recommend the intentional practice of using micro-affirmations as a way to communicate that people are "welcome, visible, and capable" to improve academic culture for everyone involved.

Rowe also studies bystander intervention. She encourages bystander training in how to better deal with all unacceptable behavior. Among her recent research is an examination of the importance of bystander intervention and protective workplace systems for occupational well-being. The study involved 1,500 physicians at Stanford University School of Medicine in fall 2020. The perception that a bystander would intervene was highly important to physicians who experienced incidents of being "mistreated, harassed, or intimidated" by patients and visitors during the COVID-19 pandemic.

Her work is mostly freely accessible and may be found at.

== Selected publications ==
- Rowe, Mary (1977). "The Saturn's Rings Phenomenon". In Proceedings of the National Science Foundation's conference on women's leadership and authority. Santa Cruz, CA: University of California.
- Rowe, Mary P. (1 June 1990). "Barriers to equality: The power of subtle discrimination to maintain unequal opportunity". Employee Responsibilities and Rights Journal. 3 (2): 153–163. doi:10.1007/BF01388340. hdl:1721.1/155957. ISSN 1573-3378.
- Rowe, Mary (March 2008). "Micro-affirmations and Micro-inequities" (PDF). Journal of the International Ombudsman Association. 1 (1): 45–48.
- Scully, Maureen A.; Rowe, Mary P. (2009). "Bystander Training within Organizations" (PDF). Journal of the International Ombudsman Association. 2 (1): 1–9.
- Rowe, Mary (February 22, 2015). "Unconscious Bias: May Micro-Affirmations Provide one Answer?". MIT Institute for Work and Employment Research.
- Rowe, M.; Gadlin, H. (2016). "The organizational ombudsman". In Roche, W. K.; Teague, P.; Colvin, A. J. S. (eds.). The Oxford handbook of conflict management in organizations. Oxford University Press. pp. 210–232.
- Rowe, Susannah G.; Stewart, Miriam T.; Van Horne, Sam; Pierre, Cassandra; Wang, Hanhan; Manukyan, Makaila; Bair-Merritt, Megan; Lee-Parritz, Aviva; Rowe, Mary P.; Shanafelt, Tait; Trockel, Mickey (6 May 2022). "Mistreatment Experiences, Protective Workplace Systems, and Occupational Distress in Physicians". JAMA Network Open. 5 (5): e2210768. doi:10.1001/jamanetworkopen.2022.10768. PMC 9077480. PMID 35522279.
- Rowe, Mary (May 2023). "Becoming an ombuds at MIT". Conflict Resolution Quarterly. 40 (4): 497–504. doi:10.1002/crq.21384. hdl:1721.1/159811. ISSN 1536-5581.
- Rowe, Mary. "For the Hesitant Bystander Who Learns of Unacceptable Behavior and Wants to be Helpful: A Checklist with Examples and Ideas to Consider".
