= Vulture (website) =

American pop culture website, founded 2007

- Editorial director: Neil Janowitz (2015–present)
- Categories: Entertainment journalism
- Publisher: Vox Media
- Founded: 2007; 19 years ago
- Language: English
- Website: www.vulture.com

Vulture is an American entertainment news website. It is the standalone pop culture section of New York magazine. Its tagline is "Devouring Culture".

== History ==
Vulture debuted in April 2007 as an entertainment blog on nymag.com, the website of New York Magazine. Melissa Maerz and Dan Kois were the founding editors. The initial focus was television and film news, especially recaps of recent television episodes. Over time, it expanded to publish news and criticism in other areas of high and low culture, such as music, books, comedy, and podcasts.

In the process of spinning off from New York Magazine, Vulture's website was redesigned in 2010 from a blog format to look more like a "full-fledged" online magazine. Vulture subsequently moved to an independent URL/domain (Vulture.com) in February 2012.

The first Vulture Festival, an annual two-day event featuring celebrities from various pop culture fields, took place in New York City in 2014.

Vulture's parent company, New York Media, bought the comedy news site Splitsider from The Awl Network in 2018 and folded some of its coverage and its editor Megh Wright into Vulture.

In September 2019, Vulture became a property of Vox Media when New York Media was acquired by Vox.

== Vulture Stunt Awards ==
In 2023, citing the lack of recognition for stunt performers, Vulture inaugurated their own Stunt Awards where awards such as "Best Stunt in an Action Film" and "Best Vehicular Stunt" are awarded annually.

== Editors-in-chief ==
People who have held the title of editorial director (editor-in-chief):

- Josh Wolk (2009–2014)
- Gilbert Cruz (2014–2015)
- Neil Janowitz (2015–present)
