= Eji =

Eji or EJI may refer to:

- Hyeja (died 623), also spelled "Eji", Buddhist priest
- European Journal of Immunology
- Equal Justice Initiative, an American legal-aid organization
- Ethical Journalism Initiative, a global campaign to support quality in media
