= News council =

Organization to look into complaints about journalism

A news council is an organization set up to look into complaints about journalism, such as inaccuracy and bias. The methods that are used vary substantially from one country to another.

== News councils in Britain ==
Complaints against British newspapers and magazines are heard by the Press Complaints Commission, which is funded by a levy on all newspapers and magazines. It does not hear complaints about journalism in other media. (See main article.)

== News councils in the United States ==
The idea of a news council has met considerable resistance from U.S. journalists, many of whom fear that it could lead to government regulation of the press. Advocates of news councils often pointed to the Minnesota News Council, which was started by the Minnesota Newspaper Association and inspired by a predecessor to Britain's Press Complaints Commission. The Minnesota News Council started hearing complaints since 1971, using a panel made up of half people from news organizations and half from the public. About half of the complaints were upheld. The organization shut down in 2011 because of reductions in funding and the number of people filing complaints.

The Minnesota News Council said it got about 40% of its money from non-news companies, 20% from news organizations, 30% from foundations and 10% from individuals. It seeks contributions from all sources except the government. It hears complaints about all news media, including broadcast and online news.

The Washington News Council, serving Washington state, was based on the Minnesota group. It held its first hearing in 1999 and operated for 15 years before closing in 2014.

In 2005, the Washington and Minnesota groups said they would award $75,000 to each of two nonprofit groups interested in starting new news councils in other states.

== News council in Bolivia ==
Bolivia's National Council of Journalist Ethics includes a National Tribunal of Journalistic Ethics, which monitors the behavior of journalists according to ethical criteria. The tribunal accepts and rules on individual complaints.

== News councils ==
- Minnesota News Council
- Washington News Council
- List of news councils worldwide
- Honolulu Community Media Council
