= National Tribunal of Journalistic Ethics =

Independent advisory body to the Bolivian press

Bolivia's National Tribunal of Journalistic Ethics (Spanish: Tribunal Nacional de Ética Periodística; TNEP) is an independent advisory body to the Bolivian press, which monitors the behavior of journalists according to ethical criteria. It forms part of the National Council of Journalist Ethics (Spanish: Consejo Nacional de Ética Periodística). First set up in February 2010, the National Tribunal accepts and rules on individual complaints against state media or private press.

The tribunal has five members, including a president, which change every two years. The original members of the tribunal were:

- Alberto Bailey Gutiérrez (President), winner of the National Journalism Prize
- María Eugenia Verástegui. (Secretary General), journalist
- Marcelo Guardia Crespo, journalist director of the Communications department at the Catholic University of Bolivia
- Waldo Albarracín Sánchez, former Ombudsman
- Eduardo Rodríguez Veltzé, former President of Bolivia (2005–06) and former Chief Justice of the Bolivian Supreme Court
