= Phil Conley =

American athlete (1934–2014)

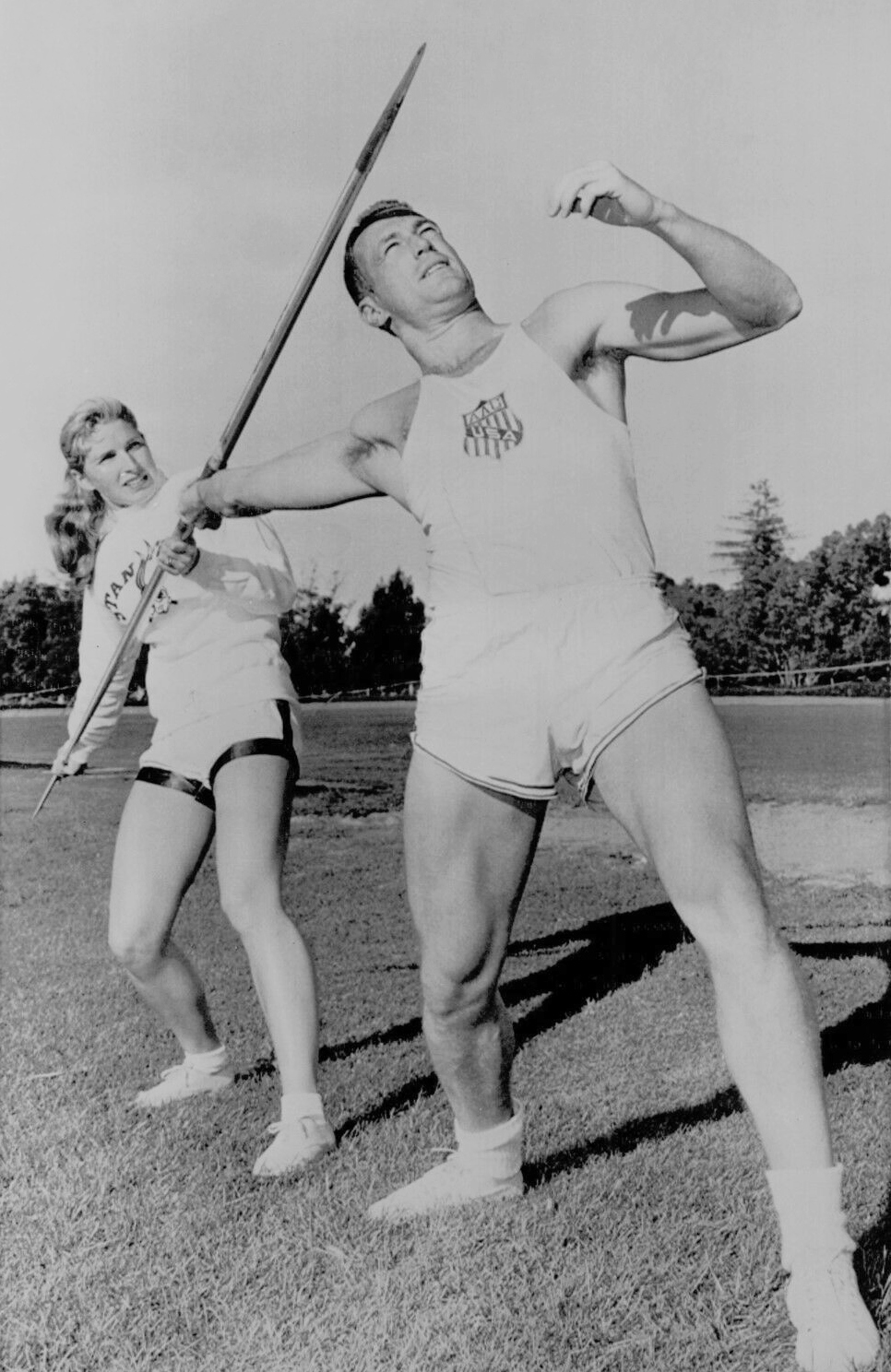
- Conley training with wife in 1964

Personal information
- Nationality: American
- Born: August 17, 1934 Madera, California, U.S.
- Died: March 12, 2014 (aged 79) Santa Rosa, California, U.S.
- Height: 190 cm (6 ft 3 in)
- Weight: 88 kg (194 lb)

Sport
- Sport: Athletics
- Event: Javelin throw
- Club: Caltech, Pasadena

Achievements and titles
- Personal best: 79.30 m (1964)
Medal record
Representing United States
Pan American Games
Silver medal – second place	1959 Chicago	Javelin

Philip Ransom Conley (August 17, 1934 – March 12, 2014) was an American athlete. He competed in the men's javelin throw at the 1956 Summer Olympics. His wife was Frances K. Conley, the first official female winner of the Bay to Breakers and an acclaimed neurosurgeon. He graduated from California Institute of Technology with a B.S. in Mechanical Engineering and earned an MBA from Harvard Business School.

== Early life ==
Phil was raised in Fresno, California, and graduated from Fresno High School in 1952. In high school Conley, an all-round athlete, lettered in basketball, tennis, football and track, and was runner-up in the San Joaquin Valley in tennis singles.

== Caltech ==
Conley (class of 1956) ranks in the top 10 for basketball career scoring average (16.1 ppg) and scoring average for a season (19.6 and 18.4 ppg). He played quarterback and defensive end for the football team and was a member of the baseball team. He won all-conference honors both in football and basketball.

Only three Caltech undergraduates have qualified for the Olympic Games: Glenn Graham (Paris, 1924); Folke Skoog (Los Angeles, 1932), and Conley. Meredith Gourdine (Helsinki, 1952) attended Caltech as a graduate student and earned his doctorate in 1960.

== Javelin ==
In February of his Freshman year, Conley asked the Caltech track coach if he could try out for high jump. Because it was raining, coach Bert La Brucherie suggested he try the javelin instead. Largely self-taught, within weeks Conley had broken the Caltech freshman record with a 176' 9-1/2" throw. From there, Conley's progress was remarkable, setting school records of 199' 2-1/2" as a sophomore, 231' 7" as a junior, and 244' 1" his senior year, 1956. That year, Conley's 239' 11" throw in an NCAA meet made him collegiate javelin champion of the United States. Conley was voted to the Masters Track and Field Hall of Fame in 2004.

== Later life ==
Conley remained active in athletics through most of his adult life. After finishing his career he served as a volunteer assistant coach at Stanford University, and also competed in masters events. In 2014, shortly after his death, he was inducted into the Caltech Sports Hall of Fame. Besides athletics, Conley worked as a financial consultant specializing in venture capital. His wife, Frances Krauskopf-Conley was a prominent neurosurgeon, and the first woman to chair a major academic neurosurgery department in the United States.
