= Entertainment journalism =

Form of journalism that focuses on popular culture

Entertainment journalism is any form of journalism that focuses on popular culture and the entertainment business and its products. Like fashion journalism, entertainment journalism covers industry-specific news while targeting general audiences beyond those working in the industry itself. Common forms include lifestyle, television and film, theater, music, video game, and celebrity coverage.

== Comparison with news journalism ==
News journalism deals with information of current events or reports of events that have previously occurred. The main purpose of this type of journalism is to inform. Entertainment journalism deals with information of the entertainment industry such as films, television shows, events, music, fashion and video games among others. The main purpose of this type of journalism is to entertain. In this area of journalism, however, it is not just about the pure reproduction of facts, as the Central European journalist Norman Schenz sums it up: "We no longer just write about an event, we tell stories"

Journalists can skew facts in a particular way that causes their story to come across as entertainment. This action can have a profound effect on the consumer, making the authenticity of the report questionable. Cases of this problem can occur in news articles, magazines, and documentaries.

== Popular forms ==
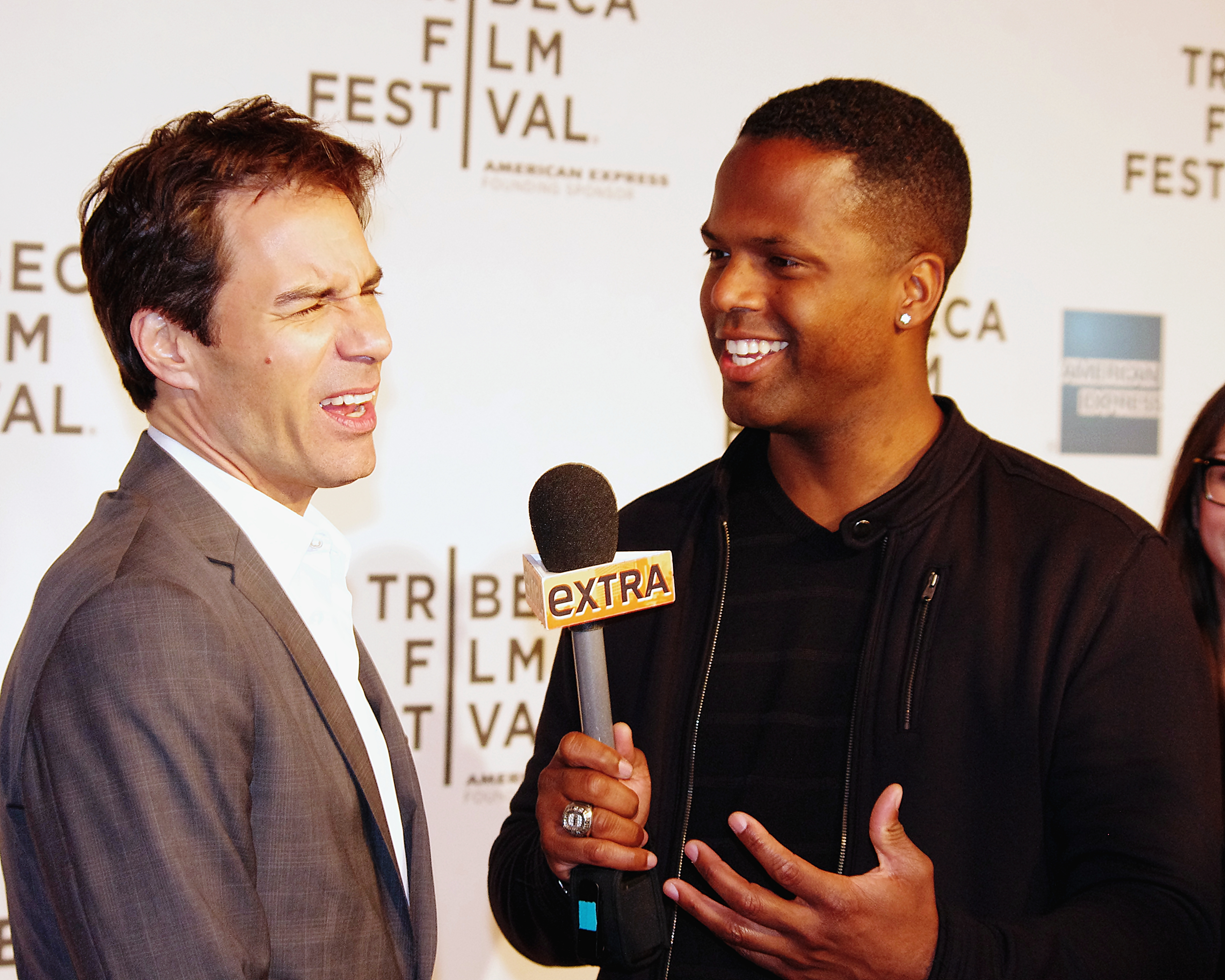
Entertainment reporter A. J. Calloway interviewing Eric McCormack at the 2012 Tribeca Film Festival premiere of Knife Fight

=== Lifestyle and celebrity ===
This is focused on celebrities and their lifestyles and feeds off television soap operas, reality television, members of royal families, and the like. Red carpet reporting and interviewing of celebrities during film festivals and award shows are part of entertainment journalism.

=== Film ===
A review or analysis of a motion picture released to the public. The critic's review or analysis is subjective and informative, with a focus to inform and entertain the consumer. Film criticism is considered to have had a major impact on the integration of the cinema into mainstream media. It is stated that film criticism wasn't fully accepted as an art until film was widely accepted in the 1960s. The Internet has further advanced the acceptance of this entertainment journalism with the introduction of film blogs and film review sites. Some popular film review sites and blogs include Rotten Tomatoes, IMDb, thatGossip and Metacritic.

=== Video game ===
A form of journalism that covers all aspects of the video game industry. The birth of the computer age in the 1990s forced media companies to release content that would attract consumers in the video game generation. Visually stimulating print magazines were introduced into the market, covering the video game industry. Some popular video game review sites and print based magazines include IGN, Game Informer, Nintendo Power, and GameSpot.

== Internet ==
The rise of the internet allowed many amateur and semi-professional personalities to start their own blogs and personal fan sites relating to entertainment journalism.

The Me Too movement can trace its roots to entertainment journalism as the centrepiece of it is Harvey Weinstein, a Hollywood mogul who not only produced independent and blockbuster films but has also worked on television and theater.

== See also ==
- Infotainment
- Journal of Religion and Theatre
