= International Ombuds Association =

The International Ombuds Association (IOA) is an organization formed to support organizational ombuds. The International Ombuds Association has a number of predecessors. It was first formed as the Corporate Ombudsman Association (COA) in 1984 under founding president Mary Rowe. In 1992, to better reflect its membership, the Corporate Ombudsman Association (COA) was re-named The Ombudsman Association (TOA). In July 2005, TOA joined with the University and College Ombudsman Association (UCOA, established 1985) to become the International Ombudsman Association (IOA). In 2021, it changed its name to the International Ombuds Association.

== Standards of Practice ==
The IOA has promulgated both Standards of Practice and a code of ethics for Organizational Ombuds; both are founded on the idea that Ombuds are to be confidential, neutral (or impartial), informal, and independent.

== Levels of Membership ==
The IOA has four levels of membership, including members, associate members, affiliate members, and retiree members. Full membership is granted to practicing Organizational Ombuds who adhere to the IOA's standards of practice and code of ethics, holds no conflicting job functions, and do not serve as an agent of the organization for purposes of notice. Associate members are practicing Organizational Ombuds who have some other job function which limits the independence, neutrality, confidentiality, or informality of their Ombudsing role, who have no job function which would make them an agent of their organization for the purpose of notice, and who support the IOA standards of practice and code of ethics but may be limited in their ability to adhere to them. Affiliate members are persons or entities that support the IOA standards of practice and code of ethics, but who do not serve as Organizational Ombuds. Retiree members practiced Ombudsry for two years as a member of the IOA, UCOA, or TOA before filing for that status.

The organization has over 500 members from a diverse number of countries and a diverse selection of fields, including government, education, and corporate settings.
