= Dispute systems design =

Dispute Systems Design (DSD) involves the creation of a set of dispute resolution processes to help an organization, institution, nation-state, or other set of individuals better manage a particular conflict and/or a continuous stream or series of conflicts. For an article about systems for dealing with disputes within organizations see also complaint systems.

== See also ==
- Conflict management

== Additional resources ==
- Harvard Negotiation and Mediation Clinical Program at Harvard Law School
- Dispute Systems Design Symposium March 7-8, 2008 at Harvard Law School
- Conflict Resolution Forum at the University of Colorado
- Journal on Dispute Resolution Symposium 2008 at Ohio State
- Beyondintractability.org
- http://web.mit.edu/ombud/publications/ for many articles about complaint systems.
