= Billy E. Jones =

American psychiatrist

Billy E. Jones is an American psychiatrist. He is considered an expert on the subject of the intersection of African American mental health and LGBTQ concerns.

== Early life and education ==
Billy Jones grew up in Dayton, Ohio. His father was a factory worker and his mother cleaned houses. Jones attended Howard University for his undergraduate degree and then Meharry Medical College where he received his medical doctorate. He completed his psychiatry residency at the New York Medical College in Valhalla, New York.Later, he earned an M.S. at New York University's Wagner Graduate School of Public Service, where he was a Kellogg Fellow in Health Care Policy.

== Career ==
Jones served as an Army psychiatrist in the Vietnam war for a year in 1969 and a year in the Army Surgeon General Office in Washington, D.C.. While on active duty, he attained the rank of Major.

In 1977, he became head of psychiatry at Lincoln Hospital. In 1990, he was sworn in as New York City's Commissioner of Mental Health. He headed the New York City Health and Hospitals Corporation from 1992 to 1994.

In 1996, Jones resigned from the board of the Gay Men's Health Crisis, a major private AIDS organization, in protest of the organization's lack of diversity and lack of focus on poorer black and brown communities struggling with AIDS. In his resignation letter, he wrote, "Much work needs to be done at G.M.H.C. to make it truly inclusive and welcoming of diversity. It is also clear that such work will be a great struggle. I am resigning because I do not choose to engage in such a struggle at G.M.H.C., but rather prefer to fight for the needs of those ravaged by H.I.V."

Jones served as president of the Black Psychiatrists of America. In addition, he was recognized as a Distinguished Life Fellow of the American Psychiatry Association.

As of 2022, Jones serves on the Health Care Board of Housing Works, a non-profit dedicated to fighting AIDS and homelessness.

== Personal life ==
Jones is openly gay and black. He has lived in Harlem, New York City since 1974.

He married his partner, Mr. Lewis E. Duckett, in 2012. The couple has been together since 1966. They have one son, Alexander (deceased) and one granddaughter, Gabriella.
