= Black Psychiatrists of America =

American medical society

- Formation: 1969

Black Psychiatrists of America is an American learned society, founded in 1969 to support the mental health of African Americans by providing them with tools to cope with racism. Its first president was Chester Pierce. Other presidents have included Billy E. Jones.
