= Munich Charter =

International Charter of the duties and rights of journalists

The Munich Charter of Professional Ethics for Journalists (or Declaration of the duties and rights of journalists) was signed on November 24, 1971, in Munich. It was later adopted by the European Federation of Journalists, as a European reference concerning the ethical conduct of journalism, distinguishing ten duties and five rights. In the 21st century Reporters Without Borders (RSF) publishes the Munich Charter to be used globally.

== History ==
The text takes up the principles of the charter of professional duties of French journalists written in 1918 and revised in 1938, to specify the rights allowing them to be respected. The name of the charter is derived from a conference organized in 1971 in Munich at the invitation of the German Journalist Association (de. Deutscher Journalisten-Verband). The French journalist Paul Parisot had drafted the declaration of the rights and duties of journalists, named in French Charte de Munich. It was signed at this conference by the attendees, all the other French journalists' unions, as well as by those of five other European common market countries (Germany, Belgium, Italy, Luxembourg and the Netherlands) and Swiss and Austrian journalist' unions.

1985 the globally working RSF (Reporters Without Borders) organization was established. RSF amended the obligation list from 10 to 11 duties and stood with the five rights as initially published in Munich. RSF uses the Munich Charter to train journalists, protect them, and to give guidance to them and increase trust to journalism in the public. Therefore, it is published as Appendix in the training section of journalists on the RSF Website in English.

The Munich Charta is endorsed by the British journalist support site: MediaWise Trust. However, only 10 duties and no rights are published by the British trust. A similar code of conduct for journalist is known from the USA also, however it is much longer and complex.

== Applicability ==
It is claimed that the concise nature of the Munich Charter, it fits on one printed page, and its long tradition based on over 100 years of codes of conduct for journalism in France, makes it a useful yardstick for the conduct of good journalism.
