= Complaint system =

Set of procedures used in organizations to address complaints & resolve disputes

A complaint system (also known as a conflict management system, internal conflict management system, integrated conflict management system, or dispute resolution system) is a set of procedures used in organizations to address complaints and resolve disputes. Complaint systems in the US have undergone significant innovation especially since about 1970 with the advent of extensive workplace regulation. Notably in multiple countries, conflict management channels and systems have evolved from a major focus on labor-management relations to a much wider purview that includes unionized workers and also managers, non-union employees, professional staff, students, trainees, vendors, donors, customers, etc.

== History ==
There is a substantial early history of scholarly work on due process, and union and non-union grievance procedures within organizations. This work focused primarily on rights-based conflict resolution between union and non-union workers and their managers. Scholarly work has evolved to cover both a wider range of conflict management channels, and, also, a much wider range of disputants.

In the 1970s and 1980s much interest arose in the United States, in dealing with conflict informally as well as formally, and in learning from conflict and managing conflict. In contemporary language, these discussions centered on the "interests" of all who would consider themselves stake-holders in a given conflict—and on systems change—as well as resolving grievances.

These discussions led to questions of how to think about complaint systems and how to link different conflict management offices and processes within an organization. Papers by Ronald Berenbeim, Mary Rowe, and Mary Rowe and Michael Baker, described a systems approach for dealing with complaints—and all kinds of disputes—within organizations.

Many authors extended the work of Berenbeim, Rowe, and Rowe and Baker, on the topic of internal complaint systems. They included: Douglas M. McCabe, William L. Ury, Jeanne M. Brett, and Stephen B. Goldberg. (Ury, Brett and Goldberg in particular described conflict resolution within organizations in terms of interests, rights and power and the possibility of looping back from rights-based processes to interest-based solutions.) Cathy Costantino and Cristina S Merchant, and Karl A. Slaikeu and Ralph H. Hasson extensively explored issues of designing conflict management systems.

The concept of an integrated conflict management system was conceived and developed by Mary Rowe, in multiple articles in the 1980s and 1990s. She saw the need to offer options for complainants and therefore a linked system of choices within an organizational system.

The idea of a systems approach has endured well. In recent years however, there has been discussion as to whether conflict should be "managed" by the organization—or whether the goal is to understand, deal with and learn from conflict. There is also concern about practical and theoretical issues in "integrating" a system, with some observers preferring the idea of "coordinating" a conflict system. However 2012 research by David Lipsky et al., suggests that an increasing number of corporations see themselves as having "integrated conflict management systems," or "ICMS."

There is also a major need to collect, review and understand the nature of conflict management and complaint systems around the world. Studies and citations are needed about how complaint systems work for women as well as men. Research is needed as to how systems work for multiple different national groups, for people of different socio-economic classes, and different ages, and different religions, and especially for contract workers and immigrant workers, in every country. Studies (and citations) are needed about complaint systems in health care, in faith-based organizations, in schools, in political organizations, in the military and in multiple specialized occupations. Studies are needed about important specialized issues like free speech.

== See also ==
- Alternative dispute resolution
- Bystander effect
- Consumer complaint
- Dispute resolution
- Dispute systems design
- Eight Disciplines Problem Solving
- Grievance (labour)
- Mediation
- Organizational ombudsman
- Whistleblower

== Additional references ==
- Lynch, Q.C., Jennifer, "The Federal Public Service Modernization Act: State of the Art Innovations in Conflict Management," Canadian Government Executive, February 2004, p. 27
- Lynch, Jennifer "Integrated Conflict Management Systems Emerge as an Organization Development Strategy" "Alternatives to the High Costs of Litigation", C.P.R. vol. 21 no. 3 May 2003; at http://www.cpradr.org/altsonline/26679885174/altmay03.pdf
- Lynch, J. "ADR and Beyond: A Systems Approach to Conflict Management," Negotiation Journal, Volume 17, Number 3, July 2001, Volume, p. 213.
- Rowe, Mary P, "Organizational Systems for Dealing with Conflict & Learning from Conflict—an Introduction"; "Systems for Dealing with Conflict and Learning from Conflict—Options for Complaint-Handling: an Illustrative Case"; "An Organizational Ombuds Office in a System for Dealing with Conflict and Learning from Conflict, or 'Conflict Management System'"; A Supplemental Chart "Analyzing Your Conflict Management System," in Harvard Negotiation Law Review on line, at hnlr.org, 2009.
- Miller, David, Staff Ombudsman, World Health Organization, Managing Cultural Differences in an International Organization Conflict Management System, in Harvard Negotiation Law Review on line, at hnlr.org, 2009.
- Bloch, Brian, ISKCON, Creating a Faith-Based Conflict Management System, in Harvard Negotiation Law Review on line, at hnlr.org, 2009.
