= Minnesota News Council =

On 4 December 1970, Robert M. Shaw, manager of the Minnesota Newspaper Association, created an internal committee to be called the Minnesota [News] Council (MNC). The council shut down in 2011.
