= Frances K. Conley =

American neurosurgeon (1940–2024)

Frances Conley
- Born: Frances Krauskopf; August 12, 1940; Palo Alto, California, U.S.
- Died: August 5, 2024 (aged 83); Sea Ranch, California, U.S.
- Education: Bryn Mawr College; Stanford University
- Occupation: Professor of neurosurgery
- Spouse: Phil Conley (m. 1963; died 2014)

Frances Krauskopf Conley (August 12, 1940 – August 5, 2024) was a professor of neurosurgery at Stanford University. She was the author of Walking Out on the Boys (1998), the story of her protest of misogyny at the university hospital. She is a crucial figure in the advancement of women in American medicine.

== Early life ==
Conley was born in 1940 to Konrad Bates Krauskopf and Kathryn McCune Krauskopf. She essentially grew up on the Stanford campus where her father was a professor of geochemistry. She decided in her early teenage years that she wanted to become a doctor even though the housewife stigma was the norm of the time.

She attended Bryn Mawr College in Lower Merion Township, Pennsylvania. In her junior year, she returned to Stanford. She then entered medical school at Stanford in 1961. Her class consisted of twelve women and sixty men and she noticed that male and female students were treated much differently. During her time at Stanford medical school, she quickly realized her true passion: surgery. Surgery was a male-dominated sub-field of medicine, but this did not stop Conley from pursuing it and she ended up finishing her M.D. degree in 1966.

She met her future husband, Phil Conley, during her time at Stanford.

== Medical career ==
Conley became the first woman to pursue a surgical internship at Stanford Hospital, graduating in 1966. In 1975, she joined the faculty as an Assistant Professor and was also appointed Chief of Neurosurgery at the Palo Alto VA Hospital in Palo Alto, California. In 1977, she became the fifth woman to become a board certified neurosurgeon in the United States. In 1982, she was the first woman to be granted a tenured professorship in neurosurgery at a U.S. medical school, and in 1986, the first to have a full professorship.

== Stanford University ==
In June 1991, she publicly resigned in protest over the work environment that included sexist attitudes and outright sexual harassment that culminated in the appointment of Dr. Gerald Silverberg as acting chair of the department of neurosurgery despite accusations against him of sexual harassment by two clerical staff. Several months later, after promises of changes in university procedures and policies on sexism, she rescinded her resignation in an effort to ensure the changes might actually be implemented.

Her book Walking Out on the Boys focused attention on the misogyny at one of the nation's leading universities and led to changes in programming throughout the country.

She was also chair of the Stanford University Academic Council in 1997 and 1998. In her later executive appointments, she worked to enact the reforms that had long been asserted to be unnecessary, already achieved, or imminent.

== Walking Out on the Boys ==
When Conley resigned from Stanford University, her book Walking Out on the Boys (Ferrar, Straus and Giroux, 1998) was released and provided an in-depth and firsthand look at the sexism that went on at the university. Conley also boldly used the real names of the biggest perpetrators. This book offered some behind-the-scenes views of the medical school located at Stanford, including certain labs and research. Her resignation and the release of this book not only created some public support towards her, but also towards other instances of sexism across the country that not only occur in medical schools of universities but throughout hospitals and research environments as well.

== Personal life and death ==
In 1971, Conley was the first official women's winner of the Bay to Breakers 12K footrace with a time of 50:45. Her husband, Phil Conley, was also an athlete, representing the United States in track and field at the 1956 Olympics.

Conley died on August 5, 2024, in Sea Ranch, California after a long illness.

== See also ==
- Stanford University School of Medicine
