= Organization of News Ombudsmen =

Non-profit organization

The Organization of News Ombudsmen and Standards Editors (ONO) is a modern, international non-profit organization. ONO membership comprises news ombudsman, readers' representatives and standards editors from around the world, working online, in print, in television and radio. All are individuals who work for professional news organizations such as the BBC, The Guardian, CBC, the ABC and SBS in Australia and The Hindu in India. Editorial standards editors work to maintain ethical practice in their newsrooms, while ombudsmen or reader representatives attempt to find mutually satisfactory solutions to complaints about coverage. Both standards editors and ombudsmen seek to explain the workings of journalism to their audiences.

Since its inception in 1980, ONO has built an active cohort of European, Scandinavian, British, South American, Indian, Australian and Canadian editorial standards and editorial complaints handling executives. It is also working to strengthen relationships with the Asian news media who share its editorial principles of independence, fairness, balance and accuracy.

== Purposes of ONO ==
The official website of ONO states that it is:

"Dedicated to protecting and enhancing quality journalism by encouraging respectful and truthful discourse about journalism’s practices and purposes."

The Organization of News Ombudsmen and Standards Editors is a best practice organisation, encouraging reliable editorial standards processes and effective editorial complaints handling mechanisms.

ONO aims to: • Promote the values of accuracy, fairness and balance in news reporting for the public good. • Assist media organizations to provide mechanisms to ensure they remain accountable to consumers of their news. • Encourage transparency within news media organizations to develop trust within their audience. • Support the role of news ombudsmen, readers' editors and other mediators between the news consumer and the media organization.

== Annual conference ==
The main event on the ONO calendar is its annual conference, which examines current challenges facing news media and news audiences and how those issues are affecting the work of its members. The 2019 ONO Conference was held in New York in association with the Columbia Journalism Review. The conference, entitled "Journalism in a Polarized World – Sharing Common Ground", examined the role and responsibilities of news media, standards editors and news ombudsman in a time of heightened political, social and economic polarization.

ONO's 2009 conference was held in Washington DC, at the offices of National Public Radio, The Washington Post and the Washington Bureau of The New York Times. The 2010 conference took place at Reuters Institute, and St Peter's College, Oxford University, Oxford, England, the 2011 conference at CBC in Montreal, Quebec, Canada, and the 2013 conference in Los Angeles, California. Conferences in Copenhagen (2014), Hamburg (2015), Buenos Aires (2016), Chennai (2017) and Amsterdam (2018) followed. Topics discussed at annual conferences are usually of an ethical nature, because news ombudsmen and standards editors are more often than not concerned with the ethics of reporting the news. Some of topics raised in the past include coverage of minorities, coverage of sex crimes, the relationship to the news department, the use of anonymous sources, invasion of privacy, plagiarism, conflicts of interest.

== Mini-conferences ==
Besides attending the ONO's annual conference, many members of the ONO often participate in small mini-conferences which are conducted by conference telephone calls or email throughout the year. Members can raise issues they are dealing with and swap viewpoints on a wide range of topics that news ombudsmen and standards editors deal with on a regular basis. The goal is to provide participants with support, counsel and problem-solving ideas.

== See also ==
- Organizational ombudsman
