= Chester Middlebrook Pierce =

American psychiatrist (1927–2016)

Chester M. Pierce
- Born: Chester Middlebrook Pierce; March 4, 1927; Glen Cove, New York, U.S.
- Died: September 23, 2016 (aged 89)
- Occupation: Psychiatrist
- Known for: Harvard University professor Senior Consultant for Sesame Street; Coining microaggression Founding president Black Psychiatrists of America

Chester Middlebrook Pierce (March 4, 1927 – September 23, 2016) was an American psychiatrist and tenured professor of education and psychiatry at Harvard Medical School. He was the first African-American full professor at Massachusetts General Hospital. In 1970 Pierce was the first African-American member of the American Board of Psychiatry and Neurology and in 1978 was elected president of the organization. In 1983 Pierce was president of the American Orthopsychiatric Association. He was a fellow in the American Academy of Arts and Sciences. He was a senior consultant for the acclaimed educational children's television series Sesame Street. He also coined and developed the term "microaggression".

== Biography ==
Chester Pierce was born on March 4, 1927, in Glen Cove, New York. At the time, only 10% of the 8,000 residents were African Americans (compared to 9.8% nationwide). Pierce became the first African American president of his high school. In 1948, he received his A.B. degree from Harvard College and in 1952 he received his M.D. degree from the Harvard Medical School. After medical school, Pierce trained as a psychiatrist in Cincinnati, Ohio.

Pierce was the first African American college football athlete to perform on the playing field of a predominantly-white university versus an all-white team below the Mason–Dixon. Harvard's opponent was University of Virginia, October 11, 1947, before a crowd of 22,000.

Pierce died on September 23, 2016, at age 89.

== Career ==
Pierce published over 180 books, articles, and reviews. His work mostly surrounds areas of racism, societal tensions, sports medicine, and the media. He was a member of the Institute of Medicine at the National Academy of Sciences as well as at the American Academy of Arts and Science. Pierce guest lectured at over 100 universities in the United States. Although Pierce retired as a psychiatrist in 1997, one of his most recent accomplishments came in 2002 when he organized an "African Diaspora" conference that brought psychiatrists from all around the globe to discuss issues and problems. Because of his efforts, the MGH Division of International Psychiatry was founded in 2003. The Harvard Foundation also commissioned a portrait of Pierce, which now hangs in the residence hall in which he lived as an undergraduate at Harvard.

Pierce was a Commander in the U.S. Navy and later a senior consultant to multiple different health-related organizations, and part of 22 editorial boards. He participated in the World Association of Social Psychiatry. Much of his time was spent working with organizations that help to promote human rights, conservation, and youth education. He was a consultant for the Children's Television Network, the Surgeon General of the U.S. Air Force, the US Arctic Research Commission, the Peace Corps, and the National Aeronautics and Space Administration.

Pierce was a professor of education and psychiatry at Harvard Medical School. He became the first African-American full professor at the Massachusetts General Hospital. Pierce was a past president of the American Board of Psychiatry and Neurology in the American Orthopsychiatric Association and later a fellow in the American Academy of Arts and Sciences. From 2001 to 2004 he was on the Carter Center Mental Health Task force and a founding president of the Black Psychiatrists of America. During that time he was also the National Chairperson of the Child Development Associate Consortium. He spent much of his career as a Senior Psychiatrist at Massachusetts General Hospital, and worked as a psychiatrist at the Massachusetts Institute of Technology for 25 years.

Pierce also served on faculty at the University of Oklahoma in the Department of Psychiatry, Neurology, and Behavioral Sciences beginning in 1960. There he co-authored a paper on the drugging of an elephant with LSD with Louis Jolyon West, who worked with the MK-ULTRA program.

Pierce and Gail Allen defined childism as a fundamental form of oppression of children.

== Works about ==
Pierce was the subject of the book Race and Excellence: My Dialogue with Chester Pierce, by Ezra E. H. Griffith, published in 1998. Pierce's role in the 1947 Harvard vs University of Virginia game, as the first black college football player to compete against an all-white team south of the Mason-Dixon Line, inspired the 2019 children's book Follow Chester! by Gloria Respress-Churchwell. He is also the subject of an upcoming documentary by Respress-Churchwell.
