= Ethical Journalism Initiative =

Media campaign

The Ethical Journalism Initiative (EJI) is a global campaign of programmes and activities to support and strengthen quality in media. It was adopted by the World Congress of the International Federation of Journalists in Moscow in 2007 and was formally launched in 2008.

The EJI has its own web site and has launched a book, To Tell You the Truth, which is an introduction to the background and some of the key themes to consider in building an ethical environment for journalism. It is co-funded by the European Union's Fundamental Rights and Citizenship Programme.

== See also ==
- Journalism ethics and standards
