= Journal of Religion and Theatre =

The Journal of Religion and Theatre was a peer-reviewed academic journal covering research on the relationship between theatre and religion. It was abstracted and indexed in the MLA International Bibliography. It was established in 2001 with Debra Bruch as founding editor-in-chief until 2006. She was succeeded by Heather Beasley until the journal was discontinued in 2010. It was published by the Religion and Theatre Focus Group of the Association for Theatre in Higher Education.
