= Ombudsman =

Official representing the interests of the public

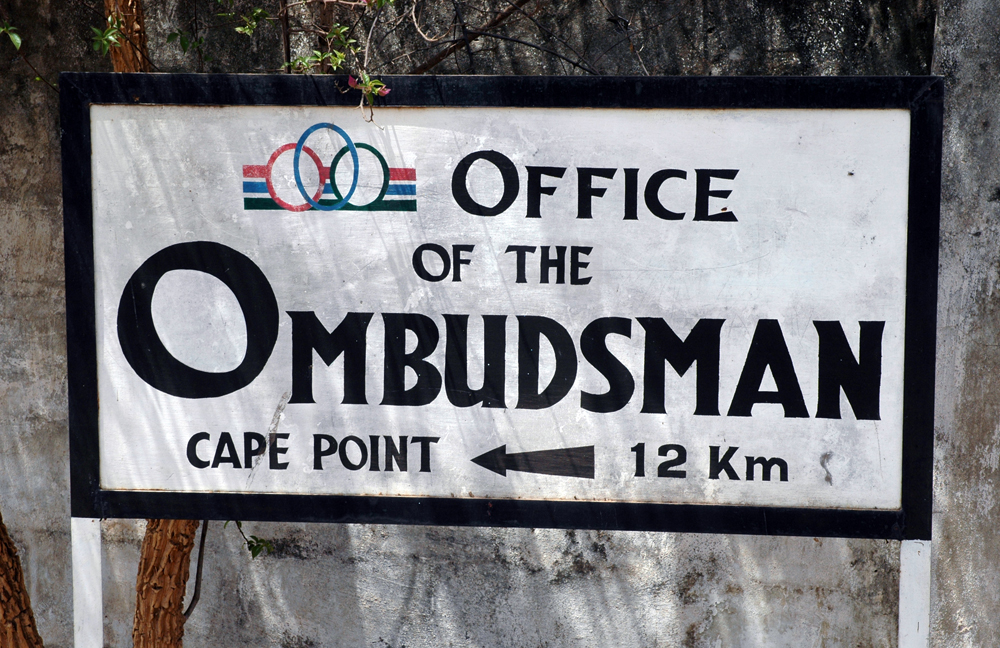
Sign in Banjul, capital of The Gambia, giving directions to the ombudsman's office

An ombudsman (/ˈɒmbʊdzmən/ OM-buudz-mən, also US: /-bədz-, -bʌdz-/ -bədz-, -budz-), ombudswoman or ombudsperson is a government official who investigates and tries to resolve complaints, usually through recommendations (binding or not) or mediation. They are usually appointed by the government or by parliament (often with a significant degree of independence).

Ombudsmen also aim to identify systemic issues leading to poor service or breaches of people's rights. At the national level, most ombudsmen have a wide mandate to deal with the entire public sector, and sometimes also elements of the private sector (for example, contracted service providers). In some cases, there is a more restricted mandate to a certain sector of society. More recent developments have included the creation of specialized children's ombudsmen.

In some countries, an inspector general, citizen advocate or other official may have duties similar to those of a national ombudsman and may also be appointed by a legislature. Below the national level, an ombudsman may be appointed by a state, local, or municipal government. Private ombudsmen may be appointed by, or even work for, a corporation such as a utility supplier, newspaper, NGO, or professional regulatory body.

In some jurisdictions, an ombudsman charged with handling concerns about national government is more formally referred to as the "parliamentary commissioner" (e.g. the United Kingdom Parliamentary Commissioner for Administration, and the Western Australian state Ombudsman). In many countries where the ombudsman's responsibility includes protecting human rights, the ombudsman is recognized as the national human rights institution. The post of ombudsman had by the end of the 20th century been instituted by most governments and by some intergovernmental organizations such as the European Union. As of 2005, including national and sub-national levels, a total of 129 offices of ombudsman have been established around the world.

== Origins and etymology ==
A prototype of an ombudsman may have flourished in China during the Qin dynasty (221 BC), and later in Korea during the Joseon dynasty. The position of secret royal inspector, or amhaeng-eosa (암행어사, 暗行御史) was unique to the Joseon dynasty, where an undercover official directly appointed by the king was sent to local provinces to monitor government officials and look after the populace while travelling incognito. The Roman tribune had some similar roles, with the power to veto acts that infringed upon the Plebeians. Another precursor to the ombudsman was the Diwān al-Maẓālim (دِيوَانُ الْمَظَالِمِ) which appears to go back to the second caliph, Umar (634–644), and the concept of Qaḍī al-Quḍāt (قَاضِي الْقُضَاةِ). They were also attested in Siam, India, the Liao dynasty, Japan, and China.

An indigenous Swedish, Norwegian, and Danish term, ombudsman, ombodsmann, ombudsmand or ombudsmann is etymologically rooted in the Old Norse word umboðsmaðr, essentially meaning 'representative' (with the word umbud/ombod/ombud meaning 'proxy', 'attorney'; that is, someone who is authorized to act for someone else, a meaning it still has in the Scandinavian languages). From 1552, it is used in the Nordic languages as the Swedish ombudsman (Note: In the Swedish Västgöta law from the 1200's, the term is umbuds man) (pronounced [ˈɔ̂mːbʉːdsˌman]), the Danish ombudsmand (Note: In the Danish Law of Jutland from 1241, the term is umbozman and concretely means a royal civil servant in a hundred), the Icelandic and Faroese umboðsmaður and the Norwegian ombudsmann/ombodsmann. The general meaning was and is approximately 'a man representing (someone)' (i.e., a representative) or 'a man with a commission (from someone)' (a commissioner). The Swedish-speaking minority in Finland uses the Swedish terminology. The various forms of the suffix -mand, -maður, et cetera, are just the forms the common Germanic word represented by the English word man have in the various languages. Thus, the modern plural form ombudsmen of the English borrowed word ombudsman is likely.

Use of the term in its modern sense began in Sweden with the Swedish Parliamentary Ombudsman instituted by the Instrument of Government of 1809, to safeguard the rights of citizens by establishing a supervisory agency independent of the executive branch. The predecessor of the Swedish Parliamentary Ombudsman was the Office of Supreme Ombudsman (Högste Ombudsmannen), which was established by the Swedish King, Charles XII, in 1713. Charles XII was in exile in the Ottoman Empire and needed a representative in Sweden to ensure that judges and civil servants acted in accordance with the laws and with their duties. If they did not do so, the Supreme Ombudsman had the right to prosecute them for negligence. In 1719 the Swedish Office of Supreme Ombudsman became the Chancellor of Justice. The Parliamentary Ombudsman was established in 1809 by the Swedish Riksdag, as a parallel institution to the still-present Chancellor of Justice, reflecting the concept of separation of powers as developed by Montesquieu.

The Parliamentary Ombudsman is the institution that the Scandinavian countries subsequently developed into its contemporary form, and which subsequently has been adopted in many other parts of the world. The word ombudsman and its specific meaning have since been adopted in various languages, such as Dutch. The German language uses Ombudsmann, Ombudsfrau and Ombudsleute. Notable exceptions are French, Italian, Spanish, and Finnish, which use translations instead. Modern variations of this term include ombud, ombuds, ombudsperson, or ombudswoman, and the conventional English plural is ombudsmen. In Nigeria, the ombudsman is known as the Public Complaints Commission or the ombudsman.

== In politics ==
In general, an ombudsman is a state official appointed to provide a check on government activity in the interests of the citizen and to oversee the investigation of complaints of improper government activity against the citizen. If the ombudsman finds a complaint to be substantiated, the problem may get rectified, or an ombudsman report is published making recommendations for change. Further redress depends on the laws of the country concerned, but this typically involves financial compensation. Ombudsmen in most countries do not have the power to initiate legal proceedings or prosecution on the grounds of a complaint. This role is sometimes referred to as a "tribunician" role, and has been traditionally fulfilled by elected representatives – the term refers to the ancient Roman "tribunes of the plebeians" (tribuni plebis), whose role was to intercede in the political process on behalf of common citizens.

The significant advantage of an ombudsman is that they examine complaints from outside the offending state institution, thus avoiding the conflicts of interest inherent in self-policing. However, the ombudsman system relies heavily on the selection of an appropriate individual for the office, and on the cooperation of at least some effective official from within the apparatus of the state. However, sociologist Jürgen Beyer has criticised the institution, stating: "Ombudsmen are relics of absolutism, designed to iron out the worst excesses of administrative arbitrariness while keeping the power structures intact."

== In organizations ==
Many private companies, universities, non-profit organisations, and government agencies also have an ombudsman (or an ombuds office) to serve internal employees, managers and/or other constituencies. These ombudsman roles are structured to function independently, by reporting to the CEO or board of directors, and, according to the International Ombudsman Association (IOA) Standards of Practice, they do not have any other role in the organisation. Organisational ombudsmen often receive more complaints than alternative procedures such as anonymous hot-lines.

Since the 1960s, the profession has grown in the United States, and Canada, particularly in corporations, universities, and government agencies. The organizational ombudsman works as a designated neutral party, one who is high-ranking in an organization, but who is not part of executive management. Using an alternative dispute resolution (ADR) or appropriate dispute resolution approach, an organisational ombudsman can provide options to whistleblowers or employees and managers with ethical concerns; provide coaching, shuttle diplomacy, generic solutions (meaning a solution which protects the identity of one individual by applying to a class of people, rather than just for the one individual) and mediation for conflicts; track problem areas; and make recommendations for changes to policies or procedures in support of orderly systems change.

== Ombudsman services by country ==
For specific ombudsmen or commissioners for children or young people, also see Children's ombudsman.

== See also ==
- Complaint system – Set of procedures used in organizations to address complaints & resolve disputes
- Global Alliance of National Human Rights Institutions (GANHRI)—Coordinates the relationship between national human right institutions and the United Nations human rights system
- Human rights activists – Person who acts to protect human rights
- Information commissioner – Government role relating to data protection and freedom of information issues
- International Ombudsman Institute (IOI)—Representing 150 public sector independent ombudsman institutions on the national, state, regional and local level around the globe
- Liaison officer – Coordinator and communicator between organizations
