= Organizational ombudsman =

Dispute resolution practitioner

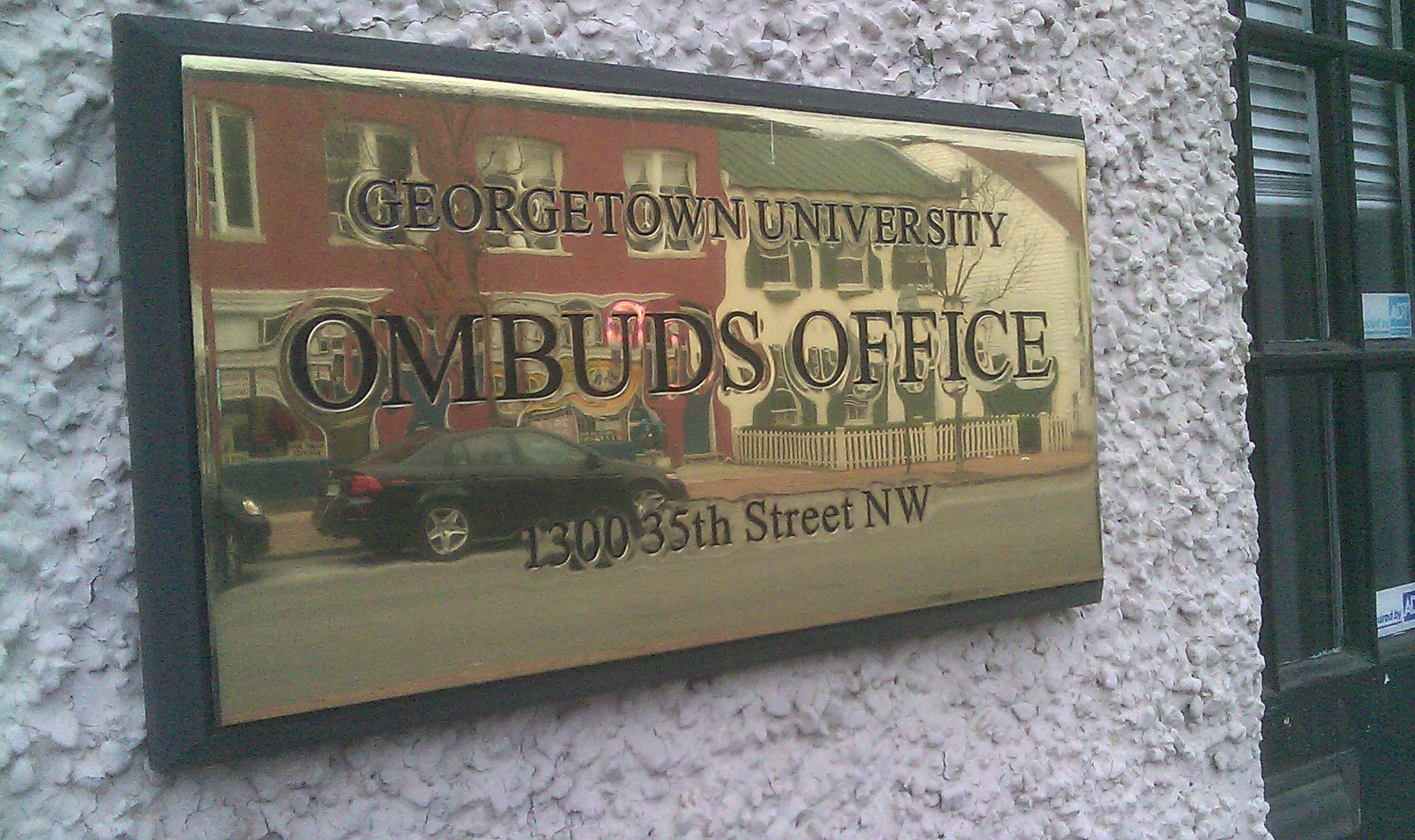
Sign outside ombuds office at Georgetown University in Washington DC

An organizational ombudsman (Note: Pronounced [/ˈämˌbədzm(ə)n/]) or ombudsperson ("ombuds") is a designated neutral or impartial dispute resolution practitioner whose major function is to provide independent, impartial, confidential and informal assistance to managers and employees, clients and/or other stakeholders of a corporation, university, non-governmental organization, governmental agency or other entity. As an independent and neutral employee, the organizational ombudsman ideally should have no other role or duties. This is in order to maintain independence and neutrality, and to prevent real or perceived conflicts of interest. Some organizations refer to an "ethics ombudsman", whose role focusses on real or perceived ethical violations and who can assist individual employees or departments to maintain an ethical approach to business issues when policies or business practices are being questioned.

Using alternative dispute resolution (ADR) methods, an organizational ombudsman provides options for people with concerns, including whistleblowers, who seek to bring their concerns forward safely and effectively. Additionally, an organizational ombudsman offers coaching on ethics and other management issues, provides mediation to facilitate conflict resolution, helps enable safe upward feedback, assists those who feel harassed and discriminated against. Overall, the organizational ombudsman helps employees and managers navigate organizational conflict, and deal with concerns and complaints.

The concept has been widely implemented, and has been spread around the globe, with many corporations, universities, government and non-government entities establishing organizational ombudsman programs. In recent years there has been much research about organizational ombudsman roles.

== Origins ==
The organizational ombudsman role has evolved from at least two sources: as an evolution from the concept of the 'classical' ombudsman and as a spontaneous creation and re-invention – of the idea of an internal, neutral conflict resolver – often by senior managers who had never heard of the classical model.

Evolution from the classical model
The classical ombudsman appeared in Sweden in the early 19th century as an independent high-level public official responsible to the parliament or legislature and appointed by constitutional or legislative provisions to monitor the administrative activities of government. This model has been copied and also adapted in many ways in many countries and milieus.

The spontaneous creation model
The organizational ombudsman role has also been regularly "re-invented" by employers who did not know of the classical ombudsman but valued the importance of a senior manager who is a neutral, independent, confidential and informal problem-solver and systems change agent. Examples appeared in the 1920s in the US and probably appeared here and there in many cultures. In many organizations the organizational ombudsman is seen as part of a complaint system or link to a complaint system, but the office is intended to function, and to appear to function, independently from all regular line and staff management, and to report to the CEO or Board of Directors.

== Impartial third party role ==
Currently, the role is considered by some as a hallmark of an ethical organization and a key component of an integrated dispute resolution system, or complaint system. Sometimes referred to as the ultimate 'inside-outsider', an organizational ombudsman adheres to professional standards strictly governing their confidentiality and neutrality. By virtue of their protected and highly placed internal role (e.g., reporting to a board of directors rather than to line or staff management), they can be particularly effective at working long-term with management to help effect change in policies, procedures, systems or structures that are problematic for employees or inefficient for the organization.

== Associations and professional standards ==
The International Ombudsman Institute supports ombudsmen institutions to cooperate. The umbrella professional association for organizational ombudsmen is the International Ombudsman Association, which provides training and establishes standards of practice.

Other non-profit think tanks, such as the Institute for Collaborative Engagement, have strongly supported the work and growth of the profession, as has the American Bar Association, through its support of standards and guidelines to establish organizational ombudsman offices.

== Specific examples ==
Universities appoint ombudsmen to handle student and staff complaints and grievances.

Corporations and businesses contract or hire an ombudsman to enable businesses and organizations to realize their goals. The Outsourcing Law Group recommends agreed appointment of an ombudsman to oversee the exit process and resolve exit-related issues on the termination of a significant outsourcing contract.

Some practitioners are certified mediators from organizations such as The Center for Dispute Resolution. Other practitioners may have a masters or Ph.D. in programs such as mediation and Conflict Studies.

In this case study involving a home services organization, the organization used an ombuds office for monitoring, reporting, conflict resolution and engagement. Team coaching tools were deployed as well. In a case study involving a manufacturing business, the role of the ombudsperson included mediation, coaching individuals within the team, coaching with leadership to discover overall goals, team diagnostic assessments, ongoing team coaching centered on organizational culture, communications, team agreements, etc., and finally, training in conflict awareness.

== See also ==
- Complaint system
